This page lists all described genera and species of the spider family Gnaphosidae. , the World Spider Catalog accepts 3059 species in 158 genera:

A

Allomicythus

Allomicythus Ono, 2009
 Allomicythus kamurai Ono, 2009 (type) — Vietnam

Allozelotes

Allozelotes Yin & Peng, 1998
 Allozelotes dianshi Yin & Peng, 1998 — China
 Allozelotes lushan Yin & Peng, 1998 (type) — China
 Allozelotes microsaccatus Yang, Zhang, Zhang & Kim, 2009 — China
 Allozelotes songi Yang, Zhang, Zhang & Kim, 2009 — China

Almafuerte

Almafuerte Grismado & Carrión, 2017
 Almafuerte facon Grismado & Carrión, 2017 — Bolivia
 Almafuerte giaii (Gerschman & Schiapelli, 1948) — Argentina
 Almafuerte goloboffi Grismado & Carrión, 2017 — Argentina
 Almafuerte kuru Grismado & Carrión, 2017 — Argentina
 Almafuerte peripampasica Grismado & Carrión, 2017 (type) — Argentina, Uruguay
 Almafuerte remota Grismado & Carrión, 2017 — Argentina
 Almafuerte vigorosa Grismado & Carrión, 2017 — Argentina

Amazoromus

Amazoromus Brescovit & Höfer, 1994
 Amazoromus becki Brescovit & Höfer, 1994 — Brazil
 Amazoromus cristus (Platnick & Höfer, 1990) — Brazil
 Amazoromus janauari Brescovit & Höfer, 1994 — Brazil
 Amazoromus kedus Brescovit & Höfer, 1994 (type) — Brazil

Amusia

Amusia Tullgren, 1910
 Amusia cataracta Tucker, 1923 — South Africa
 Amusia murina Tullgren, 1910 (type) — East Africa

Anagraphis

Anagraphis Simon, 1893
 Anagraphis incerta Caporiacco, 1941 — Ethiopia
 Anagraphis maculosa Denis, 1958 — Afghanistan
 Anagraphis minima Caporiacco, 1947 — East Africa
 Anagraphis ochracea (L. Koch, 1867) — Albania, Macedonia, Greece, Turkey
 Anagraphis pallens Simon, 1893 (type) — Libya, Malta, Greece, Turkey, Israel, Syria, Russia (Europe), Azerbaijan, Iran, Kazakhstan, Central Asia
 Anagraphis pluridentata Simon, 1897 — Syria
 Anagraphis pori Levy, 1999 — Israel

Anagrina

Anagrina Berland, 1920
 Anagrina alticola Berland, 1920 (type) — East Africa
 Anagrina nigritibialis Denis, 1955 — Niger

Aneplasa

Aneplasa Tucker, 1923
 Aneplasa balnearia Tucker, 1923 (type) — South Africa
 Aneplasa borlei Lessert, 1933 — Angola
 Aneplasa facies Tucker, 1923 — South Africa
 Aneplasa interrogationis Tucker, 1923 — South Africa
 Aneplasa nigra Tucker, 1923 — South Africa
 Aneplasa primaris Tucker, 1923 — South Africa
 Aneplasa sculpturata Tucker, 1923 — South Africa
 Aneplasa strandi Caporiacco, 1947 — East Africa

Anzacia

Anzacia Dalmas, 1919
 Anzacia daviesae Ovtsharenko & Platnick, 1995 — Australia (Queensland)
 Anzacia debilis (Hogg, 1900) — Australia (Victoria)
 Anzacia dimota (Simon, 1908) — Australia (Victoria)
 Anzacia gemmea (Dalmas, 1917) — New Zealand, Australia (Phillip Is.)
 Anzacia inornata (Rainbow, 1920) — Australia (Norfolk Is.)
 Anzacia invenusta (L. Koch, 1872) — Australia (New South Wales)
 Anzacia micacea (Simon, 1908) — Australia (Western Australia)
 Anzacia mustecula (Simon, 1908) — New Guinea, Australia (mainland, Cato Is., Lord Howe Is.)
 Anzacia perelegans (Rainbow, 1894) — Australia (New South Wales)
 Anzacia perexigua (Simon, 1880) (type) — New Caledonia
 Anzacia petila (Simon, 1908) — Australia (Western Australia)
 Anzacia respersa (Simon, 1908) — Australia (Western Australia)
 Anzacia sarrita (Simon, 1908) — Australian Capital Territory, Victoria, Tasmania
 Anzacia signata (Rainbow, 1920) — Australia (Norfolk Is.)
 Anzacia simoni Roewer, 1951 — Australia (Western Australia, Victoria)

Aphantaulax

 Aphantaulax Simon, 1878
 Aphantaulax albini (Audouin, 1826) (type) — Egypt, Ethiopia
 Aphantaulax australis Simon, 1893 — South Africa
 Aphantaulax cincta (L. Koch, 1866) — Europe, Turkey, North Africa, Israel
 Aphantaulax ensifera Simon, 1907 — São Tomé and Príncipe
 Aphantaulax fasciata Kulczyński, 1911 — Thailand, Indonesia (Java, Lombok)
 Aphantaulax flavida Caporiacco, 1940 — Ethiopia
 Aphantaulax inornata Tucker, 1923 — South Africa
 Aphantaulax katangae (Giltay, 1935) — Congo
 Aphantaulax rostrata Dankittipakul & Singtripop, 2013 — Thailand
 Aphantaulax scotophaea Simon, 1908 — Australia (Western Australia)
 Aphantaulax signicollis Tucker, 1923 — South Africa
 Aphantaulax stationis Tucker, 1923 — South Africa
 Aphantaulax trifasciata (O. Pickard-Cambridge, 1872) — Southern Europe, North Africa, Turkey, Israel, Caucasus, Russia (Europe) to Central Asia, China, Japan
 Aphantaulax trifasciata trimaculata Simon, 1878 — France
 Aphantaulax univittata Thorell, 1897 — Myanmar
 Aphantaulax voiensis Berland, 1920 — East Africa
 Aphantaulax zonata Thorell, 1895 — Myanmar

Apodrassodes

Apodrassodes Vellard, 1924
 Apodrassodes araucanius (Chamberlin, 1916) — Peru, Bolivia, Argentina, Chile
 Apodrassodes chula Brescovit & Lise, 1993 — Brazil
 Apodrassodes guatemalensis (F. O. Pickard-Cambridge, 1899) (type) — Mexico, Central, South America
 Apodrassodes mercedes Platnick & Shadab, 1983 — Chile
 Apodrassodes mono Müller, 1987 — Brazil
 Apodrassodes pucon Platnick & Shadab, 1983 — Chile
 Apodrassodes quilpuensis (Simon, 1902) — Chile
 Apodrassodes taim Brescovit & Lise, 1993 — Brazil
 Apodrassodes trancas Platnick & Shadab, 1983 — Chile, Argentina
 Apodrassodes yogeshi Gajbe, 1993 — India

Apodrassus

Apodrassus Chamberlin, 1916
 Apodrassus andinus Chamberlin, 1916 (type) — Peru

Apopyllus

Apopyllus Platnick & Shadab, 1984
 Apopyllus aeolicus Azevedo, Ott, Griswold & Santos, 2016 — Brazil
 Apopyllus atlanticus Azevedo, Ott, Griswold & Santos, 2016 — Brazil
 Apopyllus centralis Azevedo, Ott, Griswold & Santos, 2016 — Brazil
 Apopyllus gandarela Azevedo, Ott, Griswold & Santos, 2016 — Brazil
 Apopyllus huanuco Platnick & Shadab, 1984 — Peru
 Apopyllus ivieorum Platnick & Shadab, 1984 — Mexico
 Apopyllus malleco Platnick & Shadab, 1984 — Chile
 Apopyllus now Platnick & Shadab, 1984 — Curaçao, Colombia
 Apopyllus silvestrii (Simon, 1905) (type) — Peru, Bolivia, Brazil, Argentina, Chile
 Apopyllus suavis (Simon, 1893) — Venezuela, Peru, Brazil, Argentina

Aracus

Aracus Thorell, 1887
 Aracus captator Thorell, 1887 (type) — Myanmar

Arauchemus

Arauchemus Ott & Brescovit, 2012
 Arauchemus graudo Ott & Brescovit, 2012 (type) — Brazil
 Arauchemus miudo Ott & Brescovit, 2012 — Brazil

Asemesthes

Asemesthes Simon, 1887
 Asemesthes affinis Lessert, 1933 — Angola
 Asemesthes albovittatus Purcell, 1908 — Namibia, South Africa
 Asemesthes ales Tucker, 1923 — South Africa
 Asemesthes alternatus Lawrence, 1928 — Namibia
 Asemesthes ceresicola Tucker, 1923 — South Africa
 Asemesthes decoratus Purcell, 1908 — Namibia, South Africa
 Asemesthes flavipes Purcell, 1908 — Namibia
 Asemesthes fodina Tucker, 1923 — South Africa
 Asemesthes hertigi Lessert, 1933 — Angola
 Asemesthes kunenensis Lawrence, 1927 — Namibia
 Asemesthes lamberti Tucker, 1923 — South Africa
 Asemesthes lineatus Purcell, 1908 — Namibia, South Africa
 Asemesthes modestus Dalmas, 1921 — South Africa
 Asemesthes montanus Tucker, 1923 — South Africa
 Asemesthes nigristernus Dalmas, 1921 — South Africa
 Asemesthes numisma Tucker, 1923 — South Africa
 Asemesthes oconnori Tucker, 1923 — South Africa
 Asemesthes pallidus Purcell, 1908 — South Africa
 Asemesthes paynteri Tucker, 1923 — South Africa
 Asemesthes perdignus Dalmas, 1921 — Namibia
 Asemesthes purcelli Tucker, 1923 — South Africa
 Asemesthes reflexus Tucker, 1923 — South Africa
 Asemesthes septentrionalis Caporiacco, 1940 — Ethiopia
 Asemesthes sinister Lawrence, 1927 — Namibia
 Asemesthes subnubilus Simon, 1887 (type) — South Africa
 Asemesthes windhukensis Tucker, 1923 — Namibia

Asiabadus

Asiabadus Roewer, 1961
 Asiabadus asiaticus (Charitonov, 1946) (type) — Central Asia, Afghanistan

Australoechemus

Australoechemus Schmidt & Piepho, 1994
 Australoechemus celer Schmidt & Piepho, 1994 — Cape Verde Is.
 Australoechemus oecobiophilus Schmidt & Piepho, 1994 (type) — Cape Verde Is.

Austrodomus

Austrodomus Lawrence, 1947
 Austrodomus scaber (Purcell, 1904) — South Africa
 Austrodomus zuluensis Lawrence, 1947 (type) — South Africa

B

Benoitodes

Benoitodes Platnick, 1993
 Benoitodes caheni (Benoit, 1977) (type) — St. Helena
 Benoitodes sanctaehelenae (Strand, 1909) — St. Helena

Berinda

Berinda Roewer, 1928
 Berinda aegilia Chatzaki, 2002 — Greece
 Berinda amabilis Roewer, 1928 (type) — Greece (Crete)
 Berinda cooki Logunov, 2012 — Turkey
 Berinda cypria Chatzaki & Panayiotou, 2010 — Cyprus
 Berinda ensigera (O. Pickard-Cambridge, 1874) — Greece (incl. Crete), Turkey
 Berinda hakani Chatzaki & Seyyar, 2010 — Turkey
 Berinda idae Lissner, 2016 — Greece

Berlandina

Berlandina Dalmas, 1922
 Berlandina afghana Denis, 1958 — Iran, Afghanistan, Pakistan
 Berlandina apscheronica Dunin, 1984 — Russia (Europe), Azerbaijan, Kazakhstan
 Berlandina asbenica Denis, 1955 — Niger
 Berlandina avishur Levy, 2009 — Israel
 Berlandina caspica Ponomarev, 1979 — Russia (Europe to Central Asia), Caucasus, Iran, Central Asia, Mongolia
 Berlandina charitonovi Ponomarev, 1979 — Russia (Europe, Caucasus), Azerbaijan, Kazakhstan
 Berlandina cinerea (Menge, 1872) — Europe, Russia (Europe to south Siberia), Iran, Kazakhstan
 Berlandina corcyraea (O. Pickard-Cambridge, 1874) — Albania, Greece (incl. Corfu)
 Berlandina denisi Roewer, 1961 — Afghanistan
 Berlandina deserticola (Dalmas, 1921) — Algeria, Libya
 Berlandina drassodea (Caporiacco, 1934) — Karakorum
 Berlandina hui Song, Zhu & Zhang, 2004 — China
 Berlandina kolosvaryi Caporiacco, 1947 — East Africa
 Berlandina koponeni Marusik, Fomichev & Omelko, 2014 — Mongolia, China
 Berlandina litvinovi Fomichev & Marusik, 2017 — Mongolia
 Berlandina meruana (Dalmas, 1921) — East Africa
 Berlandina mishenini Marusik, Fomichev & Omelko, 2014 — Mongolia
 Berlandina nabozhenkoi Ponomarev & Tsvetkov, 2006 — Russia (Europe)
 Berlandina nakonechnyi Marusik, Fomichev & Omelko, 2014 — Mongolia
 Berlandina nenilini Ponomarev & Tsvetkov, 2006 — Kazakhstan
 Berlandina nigromaculata (Blackwall, 1865) — Cape Verde Is.
 Berlandina nubivaga (Simon, 1878) — Alps (France, Italy, Switzerland), Macedonia, Bulgaria
 Berlandina obscurata Caporiacco, 1947 — East Africa
 Berlandina ovtsharenkoi Marusik, Fomichev & Omelko, 2014 — Mongolia
 Berlandina piephoi Schmidt, 1994 — Cape Verde Is.
 Berlandina plumalis (O. Pickard-Cambridge, 1872) (type) — West Africa, Mediterranean to Central Asia, Iran
 Berlandina potanini Schenkel, 1963 — Russia (south Siberia), Mongolia, China
 Berlandina propinqua Roewer, 1961 — Afghanistan
 Berlandina pulchra (Nosek, 1905) — Turkey
 Berlandina punica (Dalmas, 1921) — Algeria, Tunisia, Libya
 Berlandina saraevi Ponomarev, 2008 — Kazakhstan
 Berlandina schenkeli Marusik & Logunov, 1995 — Russia (south Siberia)
 Berlandina shnitnikovi (Spassky, 1934) — Kazakhstan
 Berlandina shumskyi Kovblyuk, 2003 — Ukraine
 Berlandina spasskyi Ponomarev, 1979 — Russia (Europe), Kazakhstan, Mongolia, China
 Berlandina ubsunurica Marusik & Logunov, 1995 — Russia (south Siberia), Mongolia
 Berlandina venatrix (O. Pickard-Cambridge, 1874) — Libya, Egypt
 Berlandina yakovlevi Marusik, Fomichev & Omelko, 2014 — Mongolia

Brasilomma

Brasilomma Brescovit, Ferreira & Rheims, 2012
 Brasilomma enigmatica Brescovit, Ferreira & Rheims, 2012 (type) — Brazil

C

Cabanadrassus

Cabanadrassus Mello-Leitão, 1941
 Cabanadrassus bifasciatus Mello-Leitão, 1941 (type) — Argentina

Callilepis

Callilepis Westring, 1874
 Callilepis chakanensis Tikader, 1982 — India
 Callilepis chisos Platnick, 1975 — USA
 Callilepis concolor Simon, 1914 — Southern Europe
 Callilepis cretica (Roewer, 1928) — Macedonia, Greece, Turkey, Azerbaijan
 Callilepis eremella Chamberlin, 1928 — North America
 Callilepis gertschi Platnick, 1975 — USA, Mexico
 Callilepis gosoga Chamberlin & Gertsch, 1940 — USA
 Callilepis imbecilla (Keyserling, 1887) — USA, Canada
 Callilepis ketani Gajbe, 1984 — India
 Callilepis lambai Tikader & Gajbe, 1977 — India
 Callilepis mumai Platnick, 1975 — USA, Mexico
 Callilepis nocturna (Linnaeus, 1758) (type) — Europe, Caucasus, Russia (Europe to Far East), Kazakhstan, China, Japan
 Callilepis pawani Gajbe, 1984 — India
 Callilepis pluto Banks, 1896 — USA, Canada
 Callilepis rajani Gajbe, 1984 — India
 Callilepis rajasthanica Tikader & Gajbe, 1977 — India
 Callilepis rukminiae Tikader & Gajbe, 1977 — India
 Callilepis schuszteri (Herman, 1879) — Europe, Caucasus, Russia (Europe to Far East), China, Korea, Japan

Callipelis

Callipelis Zamani & Marusik, 2017
 Callipelis deserticola Zamani & Marusik, 2017 — Iran

Camillina

Camillina Berland, 1919
 Camillina aldabrae (Strand, 1907) — Africa, Seychelles. Introduced to Malaysia (Borneo)
 Camillina antigua Platnick & Shadab, 1982 — Guatemala, Honduras
 Camillina arequipa Platnick & Shadab, 1982 — Peru
 Camillina balboa Platnick & Shadab, 1982 — Panama, Colombia
 Camillina bimini Platnick & Shadab, 1982 — Bahama Is.
 Camillina biplagia Tucker, 1923 — South Africa
 Camillina brasiliensis Müller, 1987 — Brazil
 Camillina caldas Platnick & Shadab, 1982 — Brazil
 Camillina calel Platnick & Shadab, 1982 — Argentina
 Camillina campeche Platnick & Shadab, 1982 — Mexico
 Camillina capensis Platnick & Murphy, 1987 — South Africa
 Camillina cauca Platnick & Shadab, 1982 — Colombia
 Camillina cayman Platnick & Shadab, 1982 — Cayman Is.
 Camillina chiapa Platnick & Shadab, 1982 — Mexico
 Camillina chilensis (Simon, 1902) — Brazil to Chile, Juan Fernandez Is.
 Camillina chincha Platnick & Shadab, 1982 — Peru
 Camillina claro Platnick & Shadab, 1982 — Brazil
 Camillina colon Platnick & Shadab, 1982 — Panama
 Camillina cordifera (Tullgren, 1910) (type) — Central, Southern Africa, Seychelles
 Camillina cordoba Platnick & Murphy, 1987 — Argentina
 Camillina cruz Platnick & Shadab, 1982 — Ecuador (Galapagos Is.)
 Camillina cui Platnick & Murphy, 1987 — Paraguay
 Camillina desecheonis (Petrunkevitch, 1930) — Puerto Rico
 Camillina elegans (Bryant, 1940) — Caribbean. Introduced to Angola, Pacific islands
 Camillina europaea Dalmas, 1922 — Italy
 Camillina fiana Platnick & Murphy, 1987 — Madagascar, Comoros
 Camillina gaira Platnick & Shadab, 1982 — Colombia, Caribbean
 Camillina galapagoensis (Banks, 1902) — Ecuador (Galapagos Is.)
 Camillina galianoae Platnick & Murphy, 1987 — Argentina
 Camillina huanta Platnick & Shadab, 1982 — Peru
 Camillina isabela Platnick & Murphy, 1987 — Ecuador (Galapagos Is.)
 Camillina isla Platnick & Shadab, 1982 — Ecuador (Galapagos Is.)
 Camillina javieri Alayón, 2004 — Cuba
 Camillina jeris Platnick & Shadab, 1982 — Curaçao
 Camillina kaibos Platnick & Murphy, 1987 — Ivory Coast to Kenya
 Camillina kochalkai Platnick & Murphy, 1987 — Paraguay
 Camillina longipes (Nicolet, 1849) — Chile
 Camillina madrejon Platnick & Murphy, 1987 — Paraguay
 Camillina mahnerti Platnick & Murphy, 1987 — Paraguay
 Camillina major (Keyserling, 1891) — Brazil, Argentina
 Camillina marmorata (Mello-Leitão, 1943) — Argentina, Bolivia
 Camillina maun Platnick & Murphy, 1987 — Southern Africa
 Camillina mauryi Platnick & Murphy, 1987 — Argentina
 Camillina merida Platnick & Shadab, 1982 — Venezuela
 Camillina minuta (Mello-Leitão, 1941) — Argentina
 Camillina mogollon Platnick & Shadab, 1982 — Peru
 Camillina mona Platnick & Shadab, 1982 — Jamaica
 Camillina namibensis Platnick & Murphy, 1987 — Namibia
 Camillina nevada Platnick & Shadab, 1982 — Colombia
 Camillina nevis Platnick & Shadab, 1982 — Caribbean
 Camillina nova Platnick & Shadab, 1982 — Brazil, Paraguay, Argentina
 Camillina oruro Platnick & Shadab, 1982 — Bolivia, Peru, Argentina
 Camillina pavesii (Simon, 1897) — Africa
 Camillina pecki Baert, 1994 — Ecuador (Galapagos Is.)
 Camillina pedestris (O. Pickard-Cambridge, 1898) — Mexico
 Camillina penai Platnick & Murphy, 1987 — Chile, Peru
 Camillina pernambuco Müller, 1987 — Brazil
 Camillina pilar Platnick & Murphy, 1987 — Paraguay, Argentina
 Camillina piura Platnick & Shadab, 1982 — Peru
 Camillina procurva (Purcell, 1908) — South Africa
 Camillina puebla Platnick & Shadab, 1982 — Mexico, Honduras
 Camillina pulchra (Keyserling, 1891) — Brazil, Argentina. Introduced to USA
 Camillina punta Platnick & Shadab, 1982 — Peru
 Camillina recife Müller, 1987 — Brazil
 Camillina relucens (Simon, 1893) — Venezuela
 Camillina rogeri Alayón, 1993 — Cuba
 Camillina samariensis Müller, 1988 — Colombia
 Camillina sandrae Baert, 1994 — Ecuador (Galapagos Is.)
 Camillina setosa Tucker, 1923 — South Africa
 Camillina shaba FitzPatrick, 2005 — Congo
 Camillina smythiesi (Simon, 1897) — India
 Camillina tarapaca Platnick & Shadab, 1982 — Chile
 Camillina taruma Platnick & Höfer, 1990 — Brazil
 Camillina tsima Platnick & Murphy, 1987 — Madagascar
 Camillina ventana Ferreira, Zambonato & Lise, 2004 — Argentina

Canariognapha

Canariognapha Wunderlich, 2011
 Canariognapha parwis Wunderlich, 2011 (type) — Canary Is.

Caudalia

Caudalia Alayón, 1980
 Caudalia insularis Alayón, 1980 (type) — Cuba

Ceryerda

Ceryerda Simon, 1909
 Ceryerda cursitans Simon, 1909 (type) — Australia (Western Australia)

Cesonia

Cesonia Simon, 1893
 Cesonia aspida Chatzaki, 2002 — Greece (Crete), Turkey
 Cesonia bilineata (Hentz, 1847) (type) — North America
 Cesonia bixleri Platnick & Shadab, 1980 — USA
 Cesonia boca Platnick & Shadab, 1980 — Panama
 Cesonia bryantae Platnick & Shadab, 1980 — Jamaica
 Cesonia cana Platnick & Shadab, 1980 — Jamaica
 Cesonia cerralvo Platnick & Shadab, 1980 — Mexico
 Cesonia chickeringi Platnick & Shadab, 1980 — Jamaica
 Cesonia cincta (Banks, 1909) — Cuba
 Cesonia classica Chamberlin, 1924 — USA, Mexico
 Cesonia coala Platnick & Shadab, 1980 — Mexico
 Cesonia cuernavaca Platnick & Shadab, 1980 — Mexico
 Cesonia desecheo Platnick & Shadab, 1980 — Puerto Rico, Virgin Is.
 Cesonia ditta Platnick & Shadab, 1980 — Dominican Rep.
 Cesonia elegans (Simon, 1892) — St. Vincent, Dominica
 Cesonia gertschi Platnick & Shadab, 1980 — USA, Mexico
 Cesonia grisea (Banks, 1914) — Cuba
 Cesonia irvingi (Mello-Leitão, 1944) — USA, Bahama Is., Cuba
 Cesonia iviei Platnick & Shadab, 1980 — Mexico
 Cesonia josephus (Chamberlin & Gertsch, 1940) — USA
 Cesonia lacertosa Chickering, 1949 — Panama
 Cesonia leechi Platnick & Shadab, 1980 — Mexico
 Cesonia lugubris (O. Pickard-Cambridge, 1896) — Mexico, Honduras
 Cesonia maculata Platnick & Shadab, 1980 — St. Kitts and Nevis
 Cesonia nadleri Platnick & Shadab, 1980 — Hispaniola
 Cesonia notata Chickering, 1949 — Mexico, Panama
 Cesonia pudica Chickering, 1949 — Panama
 Cesonia rothi Platnick & Shadab, 1980 — USA
 Cesonia sincera Gertsch & Mulaik, 1936 — USA, Mexico
 Cesonia trivittata Banks, 1898 — USA, Mexico
 Cesonia ubicki Platnick & Shadab, 1980 — USA, Mexico

Chatzakia

Chatzakia Lissner & Bosmans, 2016
 Chatzakia balearica Lissner, 2016 — Spain (Balearic Is.)

Chileomma

Chileomma Platnick, Shadab & Sorkin, 2005
 Chileomma campana Platnick, Shadab & Sorkin, 2005 — Chile
 Chileomma chilensis Platnick, Shadab & Sorkin, 2005 — Chile
 Chileomma franckei Platnick, Shadab & Sorkin, 2005 — Chile
 Chileomma malleco Platnick, Shadab & Sorkin, 2005 — Chile
 Chileomma petorca Platnick, Shadab & Sorkin, 2005 — Chile
 Chileomma rinconada Platnick, Shadab & Sorkin, 2005 — Chile
 Chileomma ruiles Platnick, Shadab & Sorkin, 2005 (type) — Chile

Chileuma

Chileuma Platnick, Shadab & Sorkin, 2005
 Chileuma paposo Platnick, Shadab & Sorkin, 2005 (type) — Chile
 Chileuma renca Platnick, Shadab & Sorkin, 2005 — Chile
 Chileuma serena Platnick, Shadab & Sorkin, 2005 — Chile

Chilongius

Chilongius Platnick, Shadab & Sorkin, 2005
 Chilongius eltofo Platnick, Shadab & Sorkin, 2005 — Chile
 Chilongius frayjorge Platnick, Shadab & Sorkin, 2005 — Chile
 Chilongius huasco Platnick, Shadab & Sorkin, 2005 — Chile
 Chilongius molles Platnick, Shadab & Sorkin, 2005 — Chile
 Chilongius palmas Platnick, Shadab & Sorkin, 2005 (type) — Chile

Civizelotes

Civizelotes Senglet, 2012
 Civizelotes caucasius (L. Koch, 1866) — Europe to Central Asia, China
 Civizelotes civicus (Simon, 1878) (type) — Europe, Madeira, Morocco
 Civizelotes dentatidens (Simon, 1914) — Spain, France, Italy (Sardinia)
 Civizelotes gracilis (Canestrini, 1868) — Central and South-Eastern Europe, Caucasus (Russia, Georgia), Turkey
 Civizelotes ibericus Senglet, 2012 — Spain, France
 Civizelotes medianoides Senglet, 2012 — Spain
 Civizelotes medianus (Denis, 1936) — Spain, Andorra, France
 Civizelotes pygmaeus (Miller, 1943) — Europe to Kazakhstan
 Civizelotes solstitialis (Levy, 1998) — Bulgaria, Greece, Crete, Turkey, Israel, Iran
 Civizelotes tibichaetoforus Tuneva & Kuzmin, 2016 — Russia (Europe)

Cladothela

Cladothela Kishida, 1928
 Cladothela auster Kamura, 1997 — Japan
 Cladothela bistorta Zhang, Song & Zhu, 2002 — China
 Cladothela boninensis Kishida, 1928 (type) — Japan
 Cladothela hupingensis Yin, 2012 — China
 Cladothela joannisi (Schenkel, 1963) — China
 Cladothela ningmingensis Zhang, Yin & Bao, 2004 — China
 Cladothela oculinotata (Bösenberg & Strand, 1906) — China, Korea, Japan
 Cladothela parva Kamura, 1991 — China, Korea, Japan
 Cladothela tortiembola Paik, 1992 — Korea
 Cladothela unciinsignita (Bösenberg & Strand, 1906) — Korea, Japan
 Cladothela unmunensis Seo, 2017 — Korea

Coillina

Coillina Yin & Peng, 1998
 Coillina baka Yin & Peng, 1998 (type) — China

Coreodrassus

Coreodrassus Paik, 1984
 Coreodrassus forficalus Zhang & Zhu, 2008 — China
 Coreodrassus lancearius (Simon, 1893) (type) — Kazakhstan, China, Korea, Japan
 Coreodrassus semidesertus Ponomarev & Tsvetkov, 2006 — Kazakhstan

Cryptodrassus

Cryptodrassus Miller, 1943
 Cryptodrassus creticus Chatzaki, 2002 — Greece (Crete), Turkey
 Cryptodrassus helvoloides (Levy, 1998) — Israel
 Cryptodrassus helvolus (O. Pickard-Cambridge, 1872) — Cyprus, Israel, Russia (Europe)
 Cryptodrassus hungaricus (Balogh, 1935) (type) — France to Greece and Russia (Europe)

Cryptoerithus

Cryptoerithus Rainbow, 1915
 Cryptoerithus annaburroo Platnick & Baehr, 2006 — Australia (Northern Territory)
 Cryptoerithus griffith Platnick & Baehr, 2006 — Australia (Queensland, South Australia)
 Cryptoerithus halifax Platnick & Baehr, 2006 — Australia (South Australia)
 Cryptoerithus halli Platnick & Baehr, 2006 — Australia (Western Australia)
 Cryptoerithus harveyi Platnick & Baehr, 2006 — Australia (Western Australia)
 Cryptoerithus hasenpuschi Platnick & Baehr, 2006 — Australia (Queensland)
 Cryptoerithus lawlessi Platnick & Baehr, 2006 — Australia (Queensland)
 Cryptoerithus melindae Platnick & Baehr, 2006 — Australia (Western Australia)
 Cryptoerithus nichtaut Platnick & Baehr, 2006 — Australia (Queensland)
 Cryptoerithus ninan Platnick & Baehr, 2006 — Australia (Western Australia)
 Cryptoerithus nonaut Platnick & Baehr, 2006 — Australia (Northern Territory, South Australia)
 Cryptoerithus nopaut Platnick & Baehr, 2006 — Australia (Western Australia)
 Cryptoerithus nyetaut Platnick & Baehr, 2006 — Australia (Northern Territory)
 Cryptoerithus occultus Rainbow, 1915 (type) — Australia (Western Australia, Northern Territory, South Australia)
 Cryptoerithus quamby Platnick & Baehr, 2006 — Australia (Queensland)
 Cryptoerithus quobba Platnick & Baehr, 2006 — Southern Australia
 Cryptoerithus rough Platnick & Baehr, 2006 — Australia (South Australia)
 Cryptoerithus shadabi Platnick & Baehr, 2006 — Southern Australia
 Cryptoerithus stuart Platnick & Baehr, 2006 — Australia (Northern Territory)

Cubanopyllus

Cubanopyllus Alayón & Platnick, 1993
 Cubanopyllus inconspicuus (Bryant, 1940) (type) — Cuba

D

Diaphractus

Diaphractus Purcell, 1907
 Diaphractus assimilis Tullgren, 1910 — East Africa
 Diaphractus leipoldti Purcell, 1907 (type) — South Africa
 Diaphractus muticus Lawrence, 1927 — Namibia

Drassodes

Drassodes Westring, 1851
 Drassodes adisensis Strand, 1906 — Ethiopia
 Drassodes affinis (Nicolet, 1849) — Chile
 Drassodes afghanus Roewer, 1961 — Afghanistan
 Drassodes albicans (Simon, 1878) — Mediterranean
 Drassodes andamanensis Tikader, 1977 — India (Andaman Is.)
 Drassodes andorranus Denis, 1938 — Andorra
 Drassodes angulus Platnick & Shadab, 1976 — USA
 Drassodes arapensis Strand, 1908 — Peru
 Drassodes archibensis Ponomarev & Alieva, 2008 — Russia (Caucasus)
 Drassodes assimilatus (Blackwall, 1865) — Canary Is., Cape Verde Is.
 Drassodes astrologus (O. Pickard-Cambridge, 1874) — India
 Drassodes auriculoides Barrows, 1919 — USA
 Drassodes auritus Schenkel, 1963 — Russia (Europe), Kazakhstan, China
 Drassodes bechuanicus Tucker, 1923 — South Africa
 Drassodes bendamiranus Roewer, 1961 — Afghanistan
 Drassodes bicurvatus Roewer, 1961 — Afghanistan
 Drassodes bifidus Kovblyuk & Seyyar, 2009 — Turkey
 Drassodes brachythelis (Thorell, 1890) — Indonesia (Sumatra)
 Drassodes braendegaardi Caporiacco, 1949 — Kenya
 Drassodes caffrerianus Purcell, 1907 — South Africa
 Drassodes calceatus Purcell, 1907 — South Africa
 Drassodes cambridgei Roewer, 1951 — India
 Drassodes canaglensis Caporiacco, 1927 — Italy
 Drassodes carinivulvus Caporiacco, 1934 — India
 Drassodes caspius Ponomarev & Tsvetkov, 2006 — Turkey, Russia (Europe, Caucasus), Kazakhstan
 Drassodes cerinus Simon, 1897 — India
 Drassodes charcoviae (Thorell, 1875) — Ukraine
 Drassodes charitonovi Tuneva, 2004 — Kazakhstan
 Drassodes chybyndensis Esyunin & Tuneva, 2002 — Russia (Europe to Central Asia), Kazakhstan, Iran
 Drassodes clavifemur (Reimoser, 1935) — India (Karakorum, Kashmir)
 Drassodes crassipalpus (Roewer, 1961) — Afghanistan
 Drassodes cupa Tuneva, 2004 — Kazakhstan
 Drassodes cupreus (Blackwall, 1834) — Europe, Caucasus, Kazakhstan, Russia (Europe to Far East)
 Drassodes dagestanus Ponomarev & Alieva, 2008 — Russia (Caucasus)
 Drassodes daliensis Yang & Song, 2003 — China
 Drassodes delicatus (Blackwall, 1867) — India
 Drassodes deoprayagensis Tikader & Gajbe, 1975 — India
 Drassodes depilosus Dönitz & Strand, 1906 — Japan
 Drassodes deserticola Simon, 1893 — Algeria, Libya
 Drassodes difficilis (Simon, 1878) — Spain, France, Italy, Turkey?
 Drassodes dispulsoides Schenkel, 1963 — China
 Drassodes distinctus (Lucas, 1846) — Algeria
 Drassodes dregei Purcell, 1907 — South Africa
 Drassodes drydeni Petrunkevitch, 1914 — Myanmar
 Drassodes ellenae (Barrion & Litsinger, 1995) — Philippines
 Drassodes ereptor Purcell, 1907 — South Africa
 Drassodes falciger Jézéquel, 1965 — Ivory Coast
 Drassodes fedtschenkoi (Kroneberg, 1875) — Uzbekistan
 Drassodes fugax (Simon, 1878) — Portugal, Spain, France, Italy, Central Asia, China
 Drassodes gangeticus Tikader & Gajbe, 1975 — India
 Drassodes gia Melic & Barrientos, 2017 — Spain
 Drassodes gilvus Tullgren, 1910 — Tanzania
 Drassodes gooldi Purcell, 1907 — South Africa
 Drassodes gosiutus Chamberlin, 1919 — USA, Canada
 Drassodes gujaratensis Patel & Patel, 1975 — India
 Drassodes hamiger (Thorell, 1877) — Indonesia (Sulawesi)
 Drassodes hebei Song, Zhu & Zhang, 2004 — China
 Drassodes helenae Purcell, 1907 — South Africa
 Drassodes heterophthalmus Simon, 1905 — India
 Drassodes himalayensis Tikader & Gajbe, 1975 — India
 Drassodes ignobilis Petrunkevitch, 1914 — Myanmar
 Drassodes imbecillus (L. Koch, 1875) — Ethiopia
 Drassodes inermis (Simon, 1878) — Spain (Menorca), France
 Drassodes infletus (O. Pickard-Cambridge, 1885) — China (Yarkand), Russia (south Siberia), Mongolia
 Drassodes insidiator Thorell, 1897 — Myanmar
 Drassodes insignis (Blackwall, 1862) — Brazil
 Drassodes interemptor (O. Pickard-Cambridge, 1885) — China (Yarkand)
 Drassodes interlisus (O. Pickard-Cambridge, 1885) — China (Yarkand)
 Drassodes interpolator (O. Pickard-Cambridge, 1885) — Tajikistan, China (Yarkand)
 Drassodes involutus (O. Pickard-Cambridge, 1885) — China (Yarkand)
 Drassodes jakkabagensis Charitonov, 1946 — Uzbekistan, Turkmenistan
 Drassodes jiufeng Tang, Song & Zhang, 2001 — China
 Drassodes kaszabi Loksa, 1965 — Russia (south Siberia), Mongolia
 Drassodes katunensis Marusik, Hippa & Koponen, 1996 — Russia (south Siberia)
 Drassodes kibonotensis Tullgren, 1910 — Tanzania
 Drassodes krausi (Roewer, 1961) — Afghanistan
 Drassodes kwantungensis Saito, 1937 — China
 Drassodes lacertosus (O. Pickard-Cambridge, 1872) — Greece, Turkey, Israel, Syria
 Drassodes lapidosus (Walckenaer, 1802) (type) — Europe, Turkey, Israel, Caucasus, Russia (Europe to Far East), Central Asia, China, Korea, Japan
 Drassodes lapidosus bidens (Simon, 1878) — France
 Drassodes lapsus (O. Pickard-Cambridge, 1885) — China (Yarkand)
 Drassodes licenti Schenkel, 1953 — Mongolia
 Drassodes lindbergi Roewer, 1961 — Afghanistan
 Drassodes lividus Denis, 1958 — Afghanistan
 Drassodes longispinus Marusik & Logunov, 1995 — Russia (south Siberia, Far East), China, Korea
 Drassodes lophognathus Purcell, 1907 — South Africa
 Drassodes luridus (O. Pickard-Cambridge, 1874) — India
 Drassodes luteomicans (Simon, 1878) — Southern Europe
 Drassodes lutescens (C. L. Koch, 1839) — Mediterranean, Ukraine, Caucasus, Russia (Europe) to Central Asia, Pakistan
 Drassodes lyratus Purcell, 1907 — South Africa
 Drassodes lyriger Simon, 1909 — Ethiopia
 Drassodes macilentus (O. Pickard-Cambridge, 1874) — India
 Drassodes malagassicus (Butler, 1880) — Madagascar
 Drassodes mandibularis (L. Koch, 1866) — Russia (Europe)
 Drassodes manducator (Thorell, 1897) — Myanmar
 Drassodes masculus Tucker, 1923 — South Africa
 Drassodes mauritanicus Denis, 1945 — North Africa
 Drassodes meghalayaensis Tikader & Gajbe, 1977 — India
 Drassodes mirus Platnick & Shadab, 1976 — Russia (Far East), North America
 Drassodes montenegrinus (Kulczyński, 1897) — Croatia, Serbia
 Drassodes monticola (Kroneberg, 1875) — Kazakhstan, Uzbekistan, Tajikistan
 Drassodes nagqu Song, Zhu & Zhang, 2004 — China
 Drassodes narayanpurensis Gajbe, 2005 — India
 Drassodes natali Esyunin & Tuneva, 2002 — Russia (Europe), Kazakhstan
 Drassodes neglectus (Keyserling, 1887) — Russia (middle to east Siberia, Far East), North America
 Drassodes nox Dönitz & Strand, 1906 — Japan
 Drassodes nugatorius (Karsch, 1881) — Libya, Arabia
 Drassodes obscurus (Lucas, 1846) — Algeria
 Drassodes parauritus Song, Zhu & Zhang, 2004 — China
 Drassodes paroculus Simon, 1893 — Spain
 Drassodes parvidens Caporiacco, 1934 — India, Pakistan
 Drassodes pashanensis Tikader & Gajbe, 1977 — India
 Drassodes pectinifer Schenkel, 1936 — China
 Drassodes phagduaensis Tikader, 1964 — Nepal
 Drassodes placidulus Simon, 1914 — France
 Drassodes platnicki Song, Zhu & Zhang, 2004 — Russia (Europe to south Siberia), Mongolia, China
 Drassodes prosthesimiformis Strand, 1906 — Ethiopia
 Drassodes pseudolesserti Loksa, 1965 — Kazakhstan, Mongolia, China
 Drassodes pubescens (Thorell, 1856) — Europe, Turkey, Israel, Caucasus, Russia (Europe to Far East), Iran, Central Asia, China, Japan
 Drassodes robatus Roewer, 1961 — Afghanistan
 Drassodes rostratus Esyunin & Tuneva, 2002 — Russia (Europe), Kazakhstan
 Drassodes rubicundulus Caporiacco, 1934 — India, Pakistan
 Drassodes rubidus (Simon, 1878) — Portugal, Spain, France, Italy (Sardinia)
 Drassodes rugichelis Denis, 1962 — Madeira
 Drassodes russulus (Thorell, 1890) — Indonesia (Java)
 Drassodes saccatus (Emerton, 1890) — North America
 Drassodes saganus Strand, 1918 — Japan
 Drassodes sagarensis Tikader, 1982 — India
 Drassodes saitoi Schenkel, 1963 — China
 Drassodes serratichelis (Roewer, 1928) — Spain (Majorca), Greece, Turkey, Ukraine, Israel. Introduced to USA
 Drassodes serratidens Schenkel, 1963 — Russia (south Siberia to Far East), China, Korea, Japan
 Drassodes sesquidentatus Purcell, 1908 — South Africa
 Drassodes shawanensis Song, Zhu & Zhang, 2004 — China
 Drassodes similis Nosek, 1905 — Turkey
 Drassodes simplex Kulczyński, 1926 — Russia (Kamchatka)
 Drassodes simplicivulvus Caporiacco, 1940 — Ethiopia
 Drassodes singulariformis Roewer, 1951 — India
 Drassodes sirmourensis (Tikader & Gajbe, 1977) — India, China
 Drassodes sitae Tikader & Gajbe, 1975 — India
 Drassodes sockniensis (Karsch, 1881) — Libya
 Drassodes solitarius Purcell, 1907 — South Africa
 Drassodes soussensis Denis, 1956 — Morocco
 Drassodes splendens Tucker, 1923 — South Africa
 Drassodes stationis Tucker, 1923 — South Africa
 Drassodes sternatus Strand, 1906 — Ethiopia
 Drassodes striatus (L. Koch, 1866) — Hungary, Balkans, Romania, Ukraine
 Drassodes subviduatus Strand, 1906 — Ethiopia
 Drassodes taehadongensis Paik, 1995 — Korea
 Drassodes tarrhunensis (Karsch, 1881) — Libya
 Drassodes termezius Roewer, 1961 — Afghanistan
 Drassodes tesselatus Purcell, 1907 — South Africa
 Drassodes thaleri Hervé, 2009 — France
 Drassodes thimei (L. Koch, 1878) — Turkmenistan
 Drassodes tikaderi (Gajbe, 1987) — India
 Drassodes tiritschensis Miller & Buchar, 1972 — Afghanistan
 Drassodes tortuosus Tucker, 1923 — South Africa
 Drassodes unicolor (O. Pickard-Cambridge, 1872) — Greece (Crete), Libya, Egypt, Lebanon, Israel
 Drassodes uritai Tang, Oldemtu, Zhao & Song, 1999 — China
 Drassodes venustus (Nicolet, 1849) — Chile
 Drassodes villosus (Thorell, 1856) — Europe, Turkey, Central Asia, Russia (Europe to Far East)
 Drassodes viveki (Gajbe, 1992) — India
 Drassodes vorax Strand, 1906 — Ethiopia

Drassodex

Drassodex Murphy, 2007
 Drassodex cervinus (Simon, 1914) — Spain, France
 Drassodex drescoi Hervé, Roberts & Murphy, 2009 — France, Switzerland, Italy
 Drassodex fritillifer (Simon, 1914) — Spain, France
 Drassodex granja Hervé, Roberts & Murphy, 2009 — Spain
 Drassodex heeri (Pavesi, 1873) — Europe
 Drassodex hispanus (L. Koch, 1866) — Europe
 Drassodex hypocrita (Simon, 1878) (type) — Europe
 Drassodex lesserti (Schenkel, 1936) — France, Switzerland
 Drassodex simoni Hervé, Roberts & Murphy, 2009 — France, Switzerland
 Drassodex validior (Simon, 1914) — France

Drassyllus

Drassyllus Chamberlin, 1922
 Drassyllus adocetus Chamberlin, 1936 — USA
 Drassyllus adullam Levy, 2009 — Israel
 Drassyllus alachua Platnick & Shadab, 1982 — USA
 Drassyllus amamiensis Kamura, 2011 — Japan
 Drassyllus antonito Platnick & Shadab, 1982 — USA, Mexico
 Drassyllus aprilinus (Banks, 1904) — USA, Mexico
 Drassyllus arizonensis (Banks, 1901) — USA, Mexico
 Drassyllus baccus Platnick & Shadab, 1982 — Mexico
 Drassyllus barbus Platnick, 1984 — USA
 Drassyllus biglobus Paik, 1986 — Russia (Far East), Korea
 Drassyllus broussardi Platnick & Horner, 2007 — USA
 Drassyllus callus Platnick & Shadab, 1982 — Mexico
 Drassyllus carbonarius (O. Pickard-Cambridge, 1872) — Israel
 Drassyllus cerrus Platnick & Shadab, 1982 — USA
 Drassyllus chibus Platnick & Shadab, 1982 — Mexico
 Drassyllus coajus Platnick & Shadab, 1982 — Mexico
 Drassyllus conformans Chamberlin, 1936 — USA, Mexico
 Drassyllus coreanus Paik, 1986 — China, Korea
 Drassyllus covensis Exline, 1962 — USA
 Drassyllus creolus Chamberlin & Gertsch, 1940 — USA, Canada
 Drassyllus crimeaensis Kovblyuk, 2003 — Macedonia, Greece, Ukraine, Turkey, Russia (Europe, Caucasus), Azerbaijan
 Drassyllus cyprius Chatzaki & Russell-Smith, 2017 — Cyprus
 Drassyllus dadia Komnenov & Chatzaki, 2016 — Greece, Turkey
 Drassyllus depressus (Emerton, 1890) — USA, Canada, Korea
 Drassyllus dixinus Chamberlin, 1922 — USA
 Drassyllus dromeus Chamberlin, 1922 — USA, Canada
 Drassyllus durango Platnick & Shadab, 1982 — Mexico
 Drassyllus ellipes Chamberlin & Gertsch, 1940 — USA
 Drassyllus eremitus Chamberlin, 1922 — USA, Canada
 Drassyllus eremophilus Chamberlin & Gertsch, 1940 — USA, Canada
 Drassyllus eurus Platnick & Shadab, 1982 — USA
 Drassyllus excavatus (Schenkel, 1963) — China
 Drassyllus fallens Chamberlin, 1922 (type) — USA, Canada
 Drassyllus fractus Chamberlin, 1936 — USA
 Drassyllus fragilis Ponomarev, 2008 — Kazakhstan
 Drassyllus frigidus (Banks, 1892) — USA
 Drassyllus gammus Platnick & Shadab, 1982 — Mexico
 Drassyllus gynosaphes Chamberlin, 1936 — USA
 Drassyllus huachuca Platnick & Shadab, 1982 — USA
 Drassyllus inanus Chamberlin & Gertsch, 1940 — USA
 Drassyllus insularis (Banks, 1900) — North America
 Drassyllus jabalpurensis Gajbe, 2005 — India
 Drassyllus jubatopalpis Levy, 1998 — Turkey, Israel
 Drassyllus khajuriai Tikader & Gajbe, 1976 — India
 Drassyllus lamprus (Chamberlin, 1920) — North America
 Drassyllus lepidus (Banks, 1899) — USA, Mexico
 Drassyllus louisianus Chamberlin, 1922 — USA
 Drassyllus lutetianus (L. Koch, 1866) — Europe to Kazakhstan
 Drassyllus mahabalei Tikader, 1982 — India
 Drassyllus mazus Platnick & Shadab, 1982 — Mexico
 Drassyllus mexicanus (Banks, 1898) — USA, Mexico
 Drassyllus mirus Platnick & Shadab, 1982 — Mexico
 Drassyllus mormon Chamberlin, 1936 — USA, Mexico
 Drassyllus mumai Gertsch & Riechert, 1976 — USA, Mexico
 Drassyllus nannellus Chamberlin & Gertsch, 1940 — USA, Canada
 Drassyllus niger (Banks, 1896) — USA, Canada
 Drassyllus notonus Chamberlin, 1928 — USA, Mexico
 Drassyllus novus (Banks, 1895) — USA, Canada
 Drassyllus ojus Platnick & Shadab, 1982 — USA, Mexico
 Drassyllus orgilus Chamberlin, 1922 — USA, Mexico
 Drassyllus orlando Platnick & Corey, 1989 — USA
 Drassyllus pantherius Hu & Wu, 1989 — China
 Drassyllus platnicki Gajbe, 1987 — India
 Drassyllus praeficus (L. Koch, 1866) — Europe to Central Asia
 Drassyllus proclesis Chamberlin, 1922 — USA
 Drassyllus prosaphes Chamberlin, 1936 — USA, Mexico
 Drassyllus pseudovinealis Kim, Yoo & Lee, 2018 — Korea
 Drassyllus puebla Platnick & Shadab, 1982 — Mexico
 Drassyllus pumiloides Chatzaki, 2003 — Greece (Crete)
 Drassyllus pumilus (C. L. Koch, 1839) — Europe to Central Asia
 Drassyllus pusillus (C. L. Koch, 1833) — Europe, Turkey, Caucasus, Russia (Europe to Far East), Central Asia, China
 Drassyllus ratnagiriensis Tikader & Gajbe, 1976 — India
 Drassyllus rufulus (Banks, 1892) — USA, Canada
 Drassyllus salton Platnick & Shadab, 1982 — USA
 Drassyllus sanmenensis Platnick & Song, 1986 — Russia (Far East), China, Korea, Japan
 Drassyllus saphes Chamberlin, 1936 — North America
 Drassyllus sasakawai Kamura, 1987 — Korea, Japan
 Drassyllus seminolus Chamberlin & Gertsch, 1940 — USA
 Drassyllus shaanxiensis Platnick & Song, 1986 — Russia (Caucasus) to China, Korea, Japan
 Drassyllus sinton Platnick & Shadab, 1982 — USA, Mexico
 Drassyllus socius Chamberlin, 1922 — USA, Canada
 Drassyllus sonus Platnick & Shadab, 1982 — Mexico
 Drassyllus sur Tuneva & Esyunin, 2003 — Turkey, Russia (Europe, Urals), Kazakhstan, Iran
 Drassyllus talus Platnick & Shadab, 1982 — Mexico
 Drassyllus tepus Platnick & Shadab, 1982 — Mexico
 Drassyllus texamans Chamberlin, 1936 — USA, Mexico
 Drassyllus tinus Platnick & Shadab, 1982 — Mexico
 Drassyllus villicoides (Giltay, 1932) — Greece
 Drassyllus villicus (Thorell, 1875) — Europe, Azerbaijan
 Drassyllus villus Platnick & Shadab, 1982 — Mexico
 Drassyllus vinealis (Kulczyński, 1897) — Central to Eastern Europe, Turkey, Caucasus, Russia (Europe to Far East), Kazakhstan, China, Korea, Japan
 Drassyllus yaginumai Kamura, 1987 — Korea, Japan
 Drassyllus yunnanensis Platnick & Song, 1986 — China, Myanmar
 Drassyllus zimus Platnick & Shadab, 1982 — Mexico

E

Echemella

Echemella Strand, 1906
 Echemella occulta (Benoit, 1965) — Congo
 Echemella pavesii (Simon, 1909) — Ethiopia
 Echemella quinquedentata Strand, 1906 (type) — Ethiopia
 Echemella sinuosa Murphy & Russell-Smith, 2007 — Ethiopia
 Echemella strandi (Caporiacco, 1940) — Ethiopia
 Echemella tenuis Murphy & Russell-Smith, 2007 — Ethiopia

Echemographis

Echemographis Caporiacco, 1955
 Echemographis distincta Caporiacco, 1955 (type) — Venezuela

Echemoides

Echemoides Mello-Leitão, 1938
 Echemoides aguilari Platnick & Shadab, 1979 — Peru
 Echemoides argentinus (Mello-Leitão, 1940) — Argentina
 Echemoides balsa Platnick & Shadab, 1979 — Argentina
 Echemoides cekalovici Platnick, 1983 — Chile
 Echemoides chilensis Platnick, 1983 — Chile
 Echemoides gayi (Simon, 1904) — Chile
 Echemoides giganteus Mello-Leitão, 1938 (type) — Argentina
 Echemoides illapel Platnick & Shadab, 1979 — Chile
 Echemoides malleco Platnick & Shadab, 1979 — Chile
 Echemoides mauryi Platnick & Shadab, 1979 — Paraguay, Argentina
 Echemoides penai Platnick & Shadab, 1979 — Peru, Chile
 Echemoides penicillatus (Mello-Leitão, 1942) — Paraguay, Argentina
 Echemoides rossi Platnick & Shadab, 1979 — Chile
 Echemoides schlingeri Platnick & Shadab, 1979 — Chile
 Echemoides tofo Platnick & Shadab, 1979 — Chile

Echemus

Echemus Simon, 1878
 Echemus angustifrons (Westring, 1861) (type) — Europe to Central Asia
 Echemus angustifrons balticus (Lohmander, 1942) — Sweden
 Echemus chaetognathus (Thorell, 1887) — Myanmar
 Echemus chaperi Simon, 1885 — India
 Echemus chebanus (Thorell, 1897) — Myanmar
 Echemus chialanus Thorell, 1897 — Myanmar
 Echemus dilutus (L. Koch, 1873) — Australia (Queensland)
 Echemus erutus Tucker, 1923 — South Africa
 Echemus escalerai Simon, 1909 — Morocco
 Echemus ghecuanus (Thorell, 1897) — Myanmar
 Echemus hamipalpis (Kroneberg, 1875) — Uzbekistan
 Echemus incinctus Simon, 1907 — West Africa
 Echemus inermis Mello-Leitão, 1939 — Brazil
 Echemus lacertosus Simon, 1907 — São Tomé and Príncipe
 Echemus levyi Kovblyuk & Seyyar, 2009 — Turkey
 Echemus modestus Kulczyński, 1899 — Madeira
 Echemus orinus (Thorell, 1897) — Myanmar
 Echemus pictus Kulczyński, 1911 — Indonesia (Java)
 Echemus plapoensis (Thorell, 1897) — Myanmar
 Echemus scutatus (Simon, 1880) — Algeria
 Echemus sibiricus Marusik & Logunov, 1995 — Russia (south Siberia)
 Echemus viveki Gajbe, 1989 — India

Eilica

Eilica Keyserling, 1891
 Eilica albopunctata (Hogg, 1896) — Australia (South Australia, Queensland)
 Eilica amambay Platnick, 1985 — Brazil, Paraguay
 Eilica bedourie Platnick, 1985 — Australia (Queensland)
 Eilica bicolor Banks, 1896 — USA to Honduras, Cuba, Jamaica
 Eilica bonda Müller, 1987 — Colombia
 Eilica chickeringi Platnick, 1975 — Panama
 Eilica cincta (Simon, 1893) — West, Central Africa
 Eilica contacta Platnick, 1975 — Australia (Queensland, New South Wales)
 Eilica daviesae Platnick, 1985 — Australia (Queensland)
 Eilica fusca Platnick, 1975 — South Africa
 Eilica giga FitzPatrick, 1994 — Zimbabwe
 Eilica kandarpae Nigam & Patel, 1996 — India
 Eilica lotzi FitzPatrick, 2002 — South Africa
 Eilica maculipes (Vellard, 1925) — Brazil
 Eilica marchantaria Brescovit & Höfer, 1993 — Brazil
 Eilica modesta Keyserling, 1891 (type) — Brazil, Uruguay, Argentina
 Eilica mullaroo Platnick, 1988 — Australia (Victoria)
 Eilica myrmecophila (Simon, 1903) — Peru, Argentina
 Eilica obscura (Keyserling, 1891) — Brazil
 Eilica platnicki Tikader & Gajbe, 1977 — India
 Eilica pomposa Medan, 2001 — Brazil, Argentina
 Eilica rotunda Platnick, 1975 — Australia (Queensland)
 Eilica rufithorax (Simon, 1893) — Venezuela, Brazil
 Eilica serrata Platnick, 1975 — Australia (Queensland, Western Australia)
 Eilica songadhensis Patel, 1988 — India
 Eilica tikaderi Platnick, 1976 — India
 Eilica trilineata (Mello-Leitão, 1941) — Argentina, Chile, Brazil
 Eilica uniformis (Schiapelli & Gerschman, 1942) — Argentina

Eleleis

Eleleis Simon, 1893
 Eleleis crinita Simon, 1893 (type) — South Africa

Encoptarthria

Encoptarthria Main, 1954
 Encoptarthria echemophthalma (Simon, 1908) (type) — Australia (Western Australia)
 Encoptarthria grisea (L. Koch, 1873) — Australia
 Encoptarthria penicillata (Simon, 1908) — Australia (Western Australia)
 Encoptarthria perpusilla (Simon, 1908) — Australia (Western Australia)
 Encoptarthria vestigator (Simon, 1908) — Australia (Western Australia)

Epicharitus

Epicharitus Rainbow, 1916
 Epicharitus leucosemus Rainbow, 1916 (type) — Australia (Queensland)

F

Fedotovia

Fedotovia Charitonov, 1946
 Fedotovia feti Fomichev & Marusik, 2015 — Mongolia
 Fedotovia mikhailovi Fomichev & Marusik, 2015 — Mongolia
 Fedotovia mongolica Marusik, 1993 — Mongolia
 Fedotovia uzbekistanica Charitonov, 1946 (type) — Central Asia, Iran, Afghanistan

G

Gertschosa

Gertschosa Platnick & Shadab, 1981
 Gertschosa amphiloga (Chamberlin, 1936) — USA, Mexico
 Gertschosa cincta (Banks, 1929) — Panama
 Gertschosa concinna (Simon, 1895) (type) — Mexico
 Gertschosa palisadoes Platnick & Shadab, 1981 — Jamaica

Gnaphosa

Gnaphosa Latreille, 1804
 Gnaphosa aborigena Tyschchenko, 1965 — Kazakhstan
 Gnaphosa akagiensis Hayashi, 1994 — Japan
 Gnaphosa alacris Simon, 1878 — France, Italy, Croatia, Morocco
 Gnaphosa alpica Simon, 1878 — France, Switzerland, Austria
 Gnaphosa altudona Chamberlin, 1922 — USA
 Gnaphosa antipola Chamberlin, 1933 — USA, Canada
 Gnaphosa artaensis Wunderlich, 2011 — Portugal, Spain (Balearic Is.)
 Gnaphosa atramentaria Simon, 1878 — France
 Gnaphosa azerbaidzhanica Tuneva & Esyunin, 2003 — Azerbaijan
 Gnaphosa badia (L. Koch, 1866) — Europe to Azerbaijan
 Gnaphosa balearicola Strand, 1942 — Spain (Balearic Is.)
 Gnaphosa banini Marusik & Koponen, 2001 — Russia (south Siberia), Mongolia
 Gnaphosa basilicata Simon, 1882 — Italy
 Gnaphosa belyaevi Ovtsharenko, Platnick & Song, 1992 — Mongolia
 Gnaphosa betpaki Ovtsharenko, Platnick & Song, 1992 — Russia (Urals), Kazakhstan
 Gnaphosa bicolor (Hahn, 1833) — Europe, Turkey, Caucasus, Russia (Europe to west Siberia)
 Gnaphosa bithynica Kulczyński, 1903 — Greece (Crete), Turkey, Lebanon, Israel, Jordan, Iran
 Gnaphosa borea Kulczyński, 1908 — Russia (middle Siberia to Far East), North America
 Gnaphosa brumalis Thorell, 1875 — USA, Canada
 Gnaphosa californica Banks, 1904 — USA, Canada
 Gnaphosa campanulata Zhang & Song, 2001 — China
 Gnaphosa cantabrica Simon, 1914 — Spain, France
 Gnaphosa caucasica Ovtsharenko, Platnick & Song, 1992 — Russia (Caucasus)
 Gnaphosa chiapas Platnick & Shadab, 1975 — Mexico
 Gnaphosa chihuahua Platnick & Shadab, 1975 — Mexico
 Gnaphosa chola Ovtsharenko & Marusik, 1988 — Russia (middle Siberia to Far East), Mongolia, China
 Gnaphosa clara (Keyserling, 1887) — North America
 Gnaphosa corticola Simon, 1914 — France
 Gnaphosa cumensis Ponomarev, 1981 — Ukraine, Russia (Europe), Kazakhstan, Mongolia
 Gnaphosa cyrenaica (Caporiacco, 1949) — Libya
 Gnaphosa danieli Miller & Buchar, 1972 — Afghanistan
 Gnaphosa dege Ovtsharenko, Platnick & Song, 1992 — Kyrgyzstan, Pakistan, India, China
 Gnaphosa dentata Platnick & Shadab, 1975 — USA
 Gnaphosa deserta Ponomarev & Dvadnenko, 2011 — Russia (Europe)
 Gnaphosa dolanskyi Řezáč, Růžička, Oger & Řezáčová, 2018 — South-eastern Europe, Ukraine, Russia (Europe), Turkey, Caucasus
 Gnaphosa dolosa Herman, 1879 — Southern to Eastern Europe, Turkey, Syria, Iraq, Iran, Caucasus, Russia (Europe) to Central Asia
 Gnaphosa donensis Ponomarev, 2015 — Russia (Europe)
 Gnaphosa eskovi Ovtsharenko, Platnick & Song, 1992 — Kazakhstan
 Gnaphosa esyunini Marusik, Fomichev & Omelko, 2014 — Mongolia
 Gnaphosa eucalyptus Ghafoor & Beg, 2002 — Pakistan
 Gnaphosa fagei Schenkel, 1963 — Kazakhstan, China
 Gnaphosa fallax Herman, 1879 — Hungary
 Gnaphosa fontinalis Keyserling, 1887 — USA, Mexico
 Gnaphosa funerea (Dalmas, 1921) — St. Helena
 Gnaphosa gracilior Kulczyński, 1901 — Russia (middle and south Siberia to Far East), Mongolia, China
 Gnaphosa haarlovi Denis, 1958 — Central Asia
 Gnaphosa halophila Esyunin & Efimik, 1997 — Russia (Urals)
 Gnaphosa hastata Fox, 1937 — China, Korea
 Gnaphosa hirsutipes Banks, 1901 — USA, Mexico
 Gnaphosa iberica Simon, 1878 — Spain
 Gnaphosa ilika Ovtsharenko, Platnick & Song, 1992 — Kazakhstan, Kyrgyzstan, Uzbekistan
 Gnaphosa inconspecta Simon, 1878 — Western and Central Europe, Italy, Russia (middle Siberia to Far East), Mongolia, China, Korea
 Gnaphosa jodhpurensis Tikader & Gajbe, 1977 — India, China
 Gnaphosa jucunda Thorell, 1875 — Ukraine, Russia (Europe, Caucasus)
 Gnaphosa kailana Tikader, 1966 — India
 Gnaphosa kamurai Ovtsharenko, Platnick & Song, 1992 — Korea, Japan
 Gnaphosa kankhalae Biswas & Roy, 2008 — India
 Gnaphosa kansuensis Schenkel, 1936 — Russia (Far East), China, Korea
 Gnaphosa ketmer Tuneva, 2004 — Kazakhstan
 Gnaphosa khovdensis Marusik, Fomichev & Omelko, 2014 — Mongolia
 Gnaphosa kompirensis Bösenberg & Strand, 1906 — Russia (Far East), China, Korea, Taiwan, Japan, Vietnam
 Gnaphosa koponeni Marusik & Omelko, 2014 — Russia (south Siberia)
 Gnaphosa kuldzha Ovtsharenko, Platnick & Song, 1992 — Turkmenistan, Kyrgyzstan
 Gnaphosa kurchak Ovtsharenko, Platnick & Song, 1992 — Kyrgyzstan
 Gnaphosa lapponum (L. Koch, 1866) — Europe, Russia (Europe to west Siberia)
 Gnaphosa lapponum inermis Strand, 1899 — Norway
 Gnaphosa leporina (L. Koch, 1866) — Europe, Turkey, Caucasus, Russia (Europe to south Siberia), Central Asia, China
 Gnaphosa licenti Schenkel, 1953 — Russia (Europe to south Siberia), Kazakhstan, Kyrgyzstan, Mongolia, China, Korea
 Gnaphosa limbata Strand, 1900 — Norway
 Gnaphosa lonai Caporiacco, 1949 — Italy
 Gnaphosa lucifuga (Walckenaer, 1802) (type) — Europe, Turkey, Caucasus, Iran, Russia (Europe to south Siberia), Kazakhstan, China
 Gnaphosa lucifuga minor Nosek, 1905 — Turkey
 Gnaphosa lugubris (C. L. Koch, 1839) — Europe to Central Asia
 Gnaphosa mandschurica Schenkel, 1963 — Russia (middle and south Siberia), Kazakhstan, Mongolia, China, Nepal
 Gnaphosa maritima Platnick & Shadab, 1975 — USA, Mexico
 Gnaphosa mcheidzeae Mikhailov, 1998 — Georgia
 Gnaphosa microps Holm, 1939 — North America, Europe, Turkey, Russia (Europe to Far East)
 Gnaphosa modestior Kulczyński, 1897 — Italy, Austria, Czechia to Romania
 Gnaphosa moerens O. Pickard-Cambridge, 1885 — China, Nepal
 Gnaphosa moesta Thorell, 1875 — Hungary, Romania, Ukraine, Russia (Europe)?
 Gnaphosa mongolica Simon, 1895 — Turkey, Hungary to China
 Gnaphosa montana (L. Koch, 1866) — Europe, Turkey, Russia (Europe to south Siberia), Kazakhstan
 Gnaphosa muscorum (L. Koch, 1866) — North America, Europe, Caucasus, Russia (Europe to Far East), Kazakhstan, China, Korea
 Gnaphosa muscorum gaunitzi Tullgren, 1955 — Sweden, Russia (south Siberia)
 Gnaphosa namulinensis Hu, 2001 — China
 Gnaphosa nigerrima L. Koch, 1877 — Europe, Russia (Europe to Far East)
 Gnaphosa nordlandica Strand, 1900 — Norway
 Gnaphosa norvegica Strand, 1900 — Norway
 Gnaphosa occidentalis Simon, 1878 — Western Europe
 Gnaphosa oceanica Simon, 1878 — France
 Gnaphosa ogeri Lecigne, 2018 — France
 Gnaphosa oligerae Ovtsharenko & Platnick, 1998 — Russia (Far East)
 Gnaphosa opaca Herman, 1879 — Europe to Central Asia
 Gnaphosa orites Chamberlin, 1922 — North America, Northern Europe, Caucasus, Russia (Europe to Far East)
 Gnaphosa ovchinnikovi Ovtsharenko, Platnick & Song, 1992 — Kyrgyzstan
 Gnaphosa pakistanica Ovtchinnikov, Ahmad & Inayatullah, 2008 — Pakistan
 Gnaphosa parvula Banks, 1896 — USA, Canada
 Gnaphosa pauriensis Tikader & Gajbe, 1977 — India
 Gnaphosa pengi Zhang & Yin, 2001 — China
 Gnaphosa perplexa Denis, 1958 — Afghanistan
 Gnaphosa petrobia L. Koch, 1872 — Europe, Iran
 Gnaphosa pilosa Savelyeva, 1972 — Kazakhstan
 Gnaphosa poonaensis Tikader, 1973 — India
 Gnaphosa porrecta Strand, 1900 — Norway
 Gnaphosa potanini Simon, 1895 — Russia (south Siberia, Far East), Mongolia, China, Korea, Japan
 Gnaphosa potosi Platnick & Shadab, 1975 — Mexico
 Gnaphosa primorica Ovtsharenko, Platnick & Song, 1992 — Russia (Far East), Japan
 Gnaphosa prosperi Simon, 1878 — Spain
 Gnaphosa pseashcho Ovtsharenko, Platnick & Song, 1992 — Russia (Caucasus)
 Gnaphosa pseudoleporina Ovtsharenko, Platnick & Song, 1992 — Russia (south Siberia)
 Gnaphosa rasnitsyni Marusik, 1993 — Mongolia
 Gnaphosa reikhardi Ovtsharenko, Platnick & Song, 1992 — Kazakhstan, Kyrgyzstan
 Gnaphosa rhenana Müller & Schenkel, 1895 — France, Switzerland, Germany, Austria, Italy, Romania, Albania
 Gnaphosa rohtakensis Gajbe, 1992 — India
 Gnaphosa rufula (L. Koch, 1866) — Slovakia, Hungary, Ukraine, Russia (Europe), Kazakhstan
 Gnaphosa salsa Platnick & Shadab, 1975 — USA, Mexico
 Gnaphosa sandersi Gertsch & Davis, 1940 — Mexico
 Gnaphosa saurica Ovtsharenko, Platnick & Song, 1992 — Ukraine, Caucasus, Iran, Russia (Europe) to Central Asia
 Gnaphosa saxosa Platnick & Shadab, 1975 — USA
 Gnaphosa secreta Simon, 1878 — France
 Gnaphosa sericata (L. Koch, 1866) — USA to Guatemala, Cuba
 Gnaphosa serzonshteini Fomichev & Marusik, 2017 — Mongolia
 Gnaphosa similis Kulczyński, 1926 — Russia (middle and south Siberia to Far East), China, Korea
 Gnaphosa sinensis Simon, 1880 — China, Korea
 Gnaphosa snohomish Platnick & Shadab, 1975 — USA, Canada
 Gnaphosa songi Zhang, 2001 — China
 Gnaphosa sonora Platnick & Shadab, 1975 — Mexico
 Gnaphosa steppica Ovtsharenko, Platnick & Song, 1992 — Turkey, Caucasus, Ukraine, Russia (Europe to south Siberia), Kazakhstan
 Gnaphosa sticta Kulczyński, 1908 — Scandinavia, Russia (Europe to Far East), Japan
 Gnaphosa stoliczkai O. Pickard-Cambridge, 1885 — Mongolia, China
 Gnaphosa stussineri Simon, 1885 — Greece
 Gnaphosa synthetica Chamberlin, 1924 — USA, Mexico
 Gnaphosa tarabaevi Ovtsharenko, Platnick & Song, 1992 — Kazakhstan, Kyrgyzstan
 Gnaphosa taurica Thorell, 1875 — Bulgaria to China
 Gnaphosa tenebrosa Fox, 1938 — probably Mexico
 Gnaphosa tetrica Simon, 1878 — France, Macedonia
 Gnaphosa tigrina Simon, 1878 — Mediterranean, Russia (Europe, south Siberia)
 Gnaphosa tumd Tang, Song & Zhang, 2001 — China
 Gnaphosa tunevae Marusik & Omelko, 2014 — Mongolia
 Gnaphosa tuvinica Marusik & Logunov, 1992 — Russia (west and south Siberia), Mongolia
 Gnaphosa ukrainica Ovtsharenko, Platnick & Song, 1992 — Ukraine, Russia (Europe to Central Asia), Iran, Turkmenistan
 Gnaphosa utahana Banks, 1904 — USA
 Gnaphosa wiehlei Schenkel, 1963 — Russia (south Siberia), Mongolia, China
 Gnaphosa xieae Zhang & Yin, 2001 — China
 Gnaphosa zeugitana Pavesi, 1880 — North Africa
 Gnaphosa zhaoi Ovtsharenko, Platnick & Song, 1992 — China
 Gnaphosa zonsteini Ovtsharenko, Platnick & Song, 1992 — Kyrgyzstan
 Gnaphosa zyuzini Ovtsharenko, Platnick & Song, 1992 — Kazakhstan

H

Haplodrassus

Haplodrassus Chamberlin, 1922
 Haplodrassus aenus Thaler, 1984 — Switzerland, Austria
 Haplodrassus alexeevi Ponomarev & Shmatko, 2017 — Russia (Europe)
 Haplodrassus ambalaensis Gajbe, 1992 — India
 Haplodrassus atarot Levy, 2004 — Israel
 Haplodrassus belgeri Ovtsharenko & Marusik, 1988 — Russia (south to northeast Siberia, Far East)
 Haplodrassus bengalensis Gajbe, 1992 — India
 Haplodrassus bicornis (Emerton, 1909) — USA, Canada
 Haplodrassus bohemicus Miller & Buchar, 1977 — Czech Rep., Macedonia, Greece, Ukraine?, Russia (Europe, Caucasus)?
 Haplodrassus canariensis Schmidt, 1977 — Canary Is.
 Haplodrassus caspius Ponomarev & Belosludtsev, 2008 — Russia (Europe, Caucasus), Azerbaijan, Iran, Kazakhstan
 Haplodrassus caucasius Ponomarev & Dvadnenko, 2013 — Caucasus (Russia, Georgia)
 Haplodrassus chamberlini Platnick & Shadab, 1975 — North America
 Haplodrassus chotanagpurensis Gajbe, 1987 — India
 Haplodrassus cognatus (Westring, 1861) — Europe, Russia (Europe to Far East), Caucasus, Kazakhstan, Japan
 Haplodrassus cognatus ermolajewi Lohmander, 1942 — Russia (west Siberia)
 Haplodrassus concertor (Simon, 1878) — France
 Haplodrassus crassipes (Lucas, 1846) — Morocco, Algeria
 Haplodrassus creticus (Roewer, 1928) — Greece (Crete)
 Haplodrassus dalmatensis (L. Koch, 1866) — Europe, North Africa, Turkey, Middle East, Russia (Europe) to Central Asia
 Haplodrassus dalmatensis pictus (Thorell, 1875) — Spain, Madeira
 Haplodrassus dentatus Xu & Song, 1987 — China
 Haplodrassus dentifer Bosmans & Abrous, 2018 — Morocco, Algeria, Tunisia, Spain
 Haplodrassus deserticola Schmidt & Krause, 1996 — Canary Is.
 Haplodrassus dixiensis Chamberlin & Woodbury, 1929 — USA
 Haplodrassus dumdumensis Tikader, 1982 — India
 Haplodrassus eunis Chamberlin, 1922 — USA, Canada
 Haplodrassus hatsushibai Kamura, 2007 — Japan
 Haplodrassus hiemalis (Emerton, 1909) (type) — North America, Russia (Europe to Far East)
 Haplodrassus huarong Yin & Bao, 2012 — China
 Haplodrassus hunanensis Yin & Bao, 2012 — China
 Haplodrassus ibericus Melic, Silva & Barrientos, 2016 — Portugal, Spain
 Haplodrassus invalidus (O. Pickard-Cambridge, 1872) — Egypt, Cyprus, Turkey, Israel, Azerbaijan, Greece?
 Haplodrassus ivlievi Ponomarev, 2015 — Russia (Europe)
 Haplodrassus jacobi Gajbe, 1992 — India
 Haplodrassus kanenoi Kamura, 1995 — Japan
 Haplodrassus kulczynskii Lohmander, 1942 — Europe, Turkey, Russia (Europe to Far East), China, Korea
 Haplodrassus lilliputanus Levy, 2004 — Israel
 Haplodrassus longivulva Bosmans & Hervé, 2018 — Morocco, Algeria
 Haplodrassus lyndae Abrous & Bosmans, 2018 — Morocco, Algeria, Spain
 Haplodrassus macellinus (Thorell, 1871) — France, Italy, Portugal?, Spain?
 Haplodrassus maculatus (Banks, 1904) — USA, Mexico
 Haplodrassus mayumiae Kamura, 2007 — Korea, Japan
 Haplodrassus mediterraneus Levy, 2004 — Turkey, Syria, Lebanon, Israel, Jordan
 Haplodrassus mimus Chamberlin, 1922 — USA
 Haplodrassus minor (O. Pickard-Cambridge, 1879) — Europe, Turkey
 Haplodrassus moderatus (Kulczyński, 1897) — Europe, Russia (Europe to Far East), China
 Haplodrassus montanus Paik & Sohn, 1984 — Russia (Far East), China, Korea
 Haplodrassus morosus (O. Pickard-Cambridge, 1872) — Greece, Turkey, Israel
 Haplodrassus nigroscriptus (Simon, 1909) — Morocco
 Haplodrassus nojimai Kamura, 2007 — Japan
 Haplodrassus omissus (O. Pickard-Cambridge, 1872) — Canary Is., Morocco, Mediterranean
 Haplodrassus orientalis (L. Koch, 1866) — Greece, Ukraine, Russia (Europe), Kazakhstan
 Haplodrassus ovatus Bosmans & Hervé, 2018 — Algeria, Tunisia
 Haplodrassus ovtchinnikovi Ponomarev, 2008 — Turkey, Iran, Kazakhstan
 Haplodrassus paramecus Zhang, Song & Zhu, 2001 — China
 Haplodrassus pargongsanensis Paik, 1992 — Korea
 Haplodrassus ponomarevi Kovblyuk & Seyyar, 2009 — Greece, Turkey
 Haplodrassus pseudosignifer Marusik, Hippa & Koponen, 1996 — Ukraine, Russia (Europe to Central Asia), Iran
 Haplodrassus pugnans (Simon, 1880) — Israel, Russia (Europe to Far East), China, Japan
 Haplodrassus reginae Schmidt & Krause, 1998 — Cape Verde Is.
 Haplodrassus rhodanicus (Simon, 1914) — Portugal, Spain, France, Italy (Sardinia), Tunisia
 Haplodrassus rufipes (Lucas, 1846) — Morocco, Algeria, Tunisia, Portugal, Spain, France, Italy
 Haplodrassus rufus (Savelyeva, 1972) — Kazakhstan
 Haplodrassus rugosus Tuneva, 2004 — Kazakhstan
 Haplodrassus sataraensis Tikader & Gajbe, 1977 — India
 Haplodrassus securifer Bosmans & Abrous, 2018 — Morocco, Algeria, Tunisia, Portugal, Spain, France, Italy, Belgium
 Haplodrassus signifer (C. L. Koch, 1839) — North America, Europe, North Africa, Turkey, Israel, Caucasus, Russia (Europe to Far East), Central Asia, China, Korea
 Haplodrassus silvestris (Blackwall, 1833) — Europe, Turkey, Caucasus
 Haplodrassus soerenseni (Strand, 1900) — Europe, Turkey, Caucasus, Russia (Europe to Far East), Kazakhstan, China
 Haplodrassus stuxbergi (L. Koch, 1879) — Russia (west to middle Siberia)
 Haplodrassus taepaikensis Paik, 1992 — Russia (south Siberia, Far East), Korea
 Haplodrassus taibo (Chamberlin, 1919) — USA
 Haplodrassus tegulatus (Schenkel, 1963) — Russia (south Siberia), China
 Haplodrassus tehriensis Tikader & Gajbe, 1977 — India
 Haplodrassus triangularis Bosmans, 2018 — Morocco, Tunisia
 Haplodrassus typhon (Simon, 1878) — Algeria, Tunisia, Portugal, Spain, France, Italy (Sardinia)
 Haplodrassus umbratilis (L. Koch, 1866) — Europe to Kazakhstan
 Haplodrassus umbratilis gothicus Lohmander, 1942 — Sweden
 Haplodrassus vastus (Hu, 1989) — China

Herpyllus

Herpyllus Hentz, 1832
 Herpyllus australis (Holmberg, 1881) — Argentina
 Herpyllus bensonae Fox, 1938 — Mexico
 Herpyllus brachet Platnick & Shadab, 1977 — Mexico
 Herpyllus bubulcus Chamberlin, 1922 — USA, Mexico
 Herpyllus calcuttaensis Biswas, 1984 — India
 Herpyllus coahuilanus Gertsch & Davis, 1940 — Mexico
 Herpyllus cockerelli (Banks, 1901) — USA, Mexico
 Herpyllus convallis Chamberlin, 1936 — USA, Mexico
 Herpyllus coreanus Paik, 1992 — Korea
 Herpyllus ecclesiasticus Hentz, 1832 (type) — North America
 Herpyllus emertoni Bryant, 1935 — USA
 Herpyllus excelsus Fox, 1938 — USA, Mexico
 Herpyllus fidelis (O. Pickard-Cambridge, 1898) — Mexico
 Herpyllus frio Platnick & Shadab, 1977 — Mexico
 Herpyllus gertschi Platnick & Shadab, 1977 — USA, Mexico
 Herpyllus giganteus Platnick & Shadab, 1977 — Mexico
 Herpyllus goaensis Tikader, 1982 — India
 Herpyllus hesperolus Chamberlin, 1928 — North America
 Herpyllus iguala Platnick & Shadab, 1977 — Mexico
 Herpyllus lativulvus Denis, 1958 — Afghanistan
 Herpyllus malkini Platnick & Shadab, 1977 — Mexico
 Herpyllus paropanisadensis Denis, 1958 — Afghanistan
 Herpyllus perditus (Banks, 1898) — Mexico
 Herpyllus perote Platnick & Shadab, 1977 — Mexico
 Herpyllus pictus (F. O. Pickard-Cambridge, 1899) — Mexico
 Herpyllus propinquus (Keyserling, 1887) — North America
 Herpyllus proximus Denis, 1958 — Turkmenistan, Afghanistan
 Herpyllus regnans Chamberlin, 1936 — USA
 Herpyllus reservatus Chamberlin, 1936 — USA, Mexico
 Herpyllus scholasticus Chamberlin, 1922 — USA
 Herpyllus schwarzi (Banks, 1901) — USA
 Herpyllus sherus Platnick & Shadab, 1977 — Mexico
 Herpyllus vicinus Denis, 1958 — Afghanistan

Heser

Heser Tuneva, 2004
 Heser aradensis (Levy, 1998) — Israel
 Heser bernardi (Marinaro, 1967) — Spain, Algeria
 Heser bonneti (Marinaro, 1967) — Algeria
 Heser hierosolymitanus (Levy, 1998) — Israel
 Heser hispanus Senglet, 2012 — Spain
 Heser infumatus (O. Pickard-Cambridge, 1872) — Tanzania, Egypt, Israel
 Heser malefactor Tuneva, 2004 (type) — Kazakhstan
 Heser nilicola (O. Pickard-Cambridge, 1874) — Mediterranean, Canary Is. Introduced to USA, Mexico
 Heser schmitzi (Kulczyński, 1899) — Spain, Madeira, Canary Is. Introduced to USA
 Heser stoevi Deltshev, 2016 — Turkmenistan
 Heser vijayanagara Bosselaers, 2010 — India

Hitobia

Hitobia Kamura, 1992
 Hitobia asiatica (Bösenberg & Strand, 1906) — Japan
 Hitobia cancellata Yin, Peng, Gong & Kim, 1996 — China
 Hitobia chayuensis Song, Zhu & Zhang, 2004 — China
 Hitobia hirtella Wang & Peng, 2014 — China
 Hitobia makotoi Kamura, 2011 — China, Japan
 Hitobia menglong Song, Zhu & Zhang, 2004 — China
 Hitobia monsta Yin, Peng, Gong & Kim, 1996 — China
 Hitobia procula Sankaran & Sebastian, 2018 — India
 Hitobia shaohai Yin & Bao, 2012 — China
 Hitobia shimen Yin & Bao, 2012 — China
 Hitobia taiwanica Zhang, Zhu & Tso, 2009 — Taiwan
 Hitobia tengchong Wang & Peng, 2014 — China
 Hitobia tenuicincta (Simon, 1909) — Vietnam
 Hitobia unifascigera (Bösenberg & Strand, 1906) (type) — China, Korea, Japan
 Hitobia yaginumai Deeleman-Reinhold, 2001 — Thailand
 Hitobia yasunosukei Kamura, 1992 — China, Okinawa
 Hitobia yunnan Song, Zhu & Zhang, 2004 — China

Homoeothele

Homoeothele Simon, 1908
 Homoeothele micans Simon, 1908 (type) — Australia (Western Australia)

Hongkongia

Hongkongia Song & Zhu, 1998
 Hongkongia caeca Deeleman-Reinhold, 2001 — Indonesia (Moluccas)
 Hongkongia reptrix Deeleman-Reinhold, 2001 — Indonesia (Java, Borneo, Bali)
 Hongkongia songi Zhang, Zhu & Tso, 2009 — Taiwan
 Hongkongia wuae Song & Zhu, 1998 (type) — China, Hong Kong, Indonesia (Sulawesi)

Hypodrassodes

Hypodrassodes Dalmas, 1919
 Hypodrassodes apicus Forster, 1979 — New Zealand
 Hypodrassodes asbolodes (Rainbow & Pulleine, 1920) — Australia (Lord Howe Is.)
 Hypodrassodes canacus Berland, 1924 — New Caledonia
 Hypodrassodes cockerelli Berland, 1932 — New Caledonia
 Hypodrassodes courti Forster, 1979 — New Zealand
 Hypodrassodes crassus Forster, 1979 — New Zealand
 Hypodrassodes dalmasi Forster, 1979 — New Zealand
 Hypodrassodes ignambensis Berland, 1924 — New Caledonia
 Hypodrassodes insulanus Forster, 1979 — New Zealand
 Hypodrassodes isopus Forster, 1979 — New Zealand
 Hypodrassodes maoricus (Dalmas, 1917) (type) — New Zealand

I

Ibala

Ibala Fitzpatrick, 2009
 Ibala arcus (Tucker, 1923) (type) — Zimbabwe, South Africa
 Ibala bilinearis (Tucker, 1923) — South Africa
 Ibala bulawayensis (Tucker, 1923) — Zimbabwe, South Africa
 Ibala declani Fitzpatrick, 2009 — Zimbabwe
 Ibala gonono Fitzpatrick, 2009 — Zimbabwe
 Ibala hessei (Lawrence, 1928) — Namibia
 Ibala isikela Fitzpatrick, 2009 — Zambia, Zimbabwe
 Ibala kaokoensis (Lawrence, 1928) — Namibia
 Ibala kevini Fitzpatrick, 2009 — Zimbabwe
 Ibala kylae Fitzpatrick, 2009 — Zimbabwe
 Ibala lapidaria (Lawrence, 1928) — Namibia
 Ibala mabalauta Fitzpatrick, 2009 — Zimbabwe
 Ibala minshullae Fitzpatrick, 2009 — Zimbabwe
 Ibala okorosave Fitzpatrick, 2009 — Namibia
 Ibala omuramba (Lawrence, 1927) — Namibia
 Ibala quadrativulva (Lawrence, 1927) — Namibia
 Ibala robinsoni Fitzpatrick, 2009 — Zimbabwe, Botswana

Intruda

Intruda Forster, 1979
 Intruda signata (Hogg, 1900) (type) — Australia (Victoria), New Zealand

Iranotricha

Iranotricha Zamani & Marusik, 2018
 Iranotricha lutensis Zamani & Marusik, 2018 (type) — Iran

K

Kaitawa

Kaitawa Forster, 1979
 Kaitawa insulare (Marples, 1956) (type) — New Zealand

Katumbea

Katumbea Cooke, 1964
 Katumbea oxoniensis Cooke, 1964 (type) — Tanzania

Kishidaia

Kishidaia Yaginuma, 1960
 Kishidaia albimaculata (Saito, 1934) (type) — Russia (Far East), China, Japan
 Kishidaia conspicua (L. Koch, 1866) — Europe, Caucasus, Russia (Europe to Far East), Central Asia, China
 Kishidaia conspicua concolor (Caporiacco, 1951) — Italy
 Kishidaia coreana (Paik, 1992) — Korea

L

Ladissa

Ladissa Simon, 1907
 Ladissa africana Simon, 1907 — Sierra Leone
 Ladissa inda (Simon, 1897) (type) — India
 Ladissa latecingulata Simon, 1907 — India
 Ladissa semirufa Simon, 1907 — Benin

Laronius

Laronius Platnick & Deeleman-Reinhold, 2001
 Laronius erewan Platnick & Deeleman-Reinhold, 2001 (type) — Thailand, Indonesia (Sumatra)

Lasophorus

Lasophorus Chatzaki, 2018
 Lasophorus zakkak Chatzaki, 2018 — Greece
 Lasophorus zografae Chatzaki, 2018 — Greece

Latonigena

Latonigena Simon, 1893
 Latonigena auricomis Simon, 1893 (type) — Brazil, Uruguay, Argentina
 Latonigena beni Ott, Rodrigues & Brescovit, 2012 — Bolivia, Brazil
 Latonigena colombo Ott, Rodrigues & Brescovit, 2012 — Brazil
 Latonigena lami Ott, Rodrigues & Brescovit, 2012 — Brazil, Argentina
 Latonigena pampa López Carrión & Grismado, 2014 — Argentina
 Latonigena pittieri López Carrión & Grismado, 2014 — Venezuela
 Latonigena santana Ott, Rodrigues & Brescovit, 2012 — Brazil, Argentina
 Latonigena sapiranga Ott, Rodrigues & Brescovit, 2012 — Brazil
 Latonigena taim Ott, Rodrigues & Brescovit, 2012 — Brazil
 Latonigena turvo Ott, Rodrigues & Brescovit, 2012 — Brazil, Argentina

Leptodrassex

Leptodrassex Murphy, 2007
 Leptodrassex algericus (Dalmas, 1919) — Algeria, Libya
 Leptodrassex hylaestomachi (Berland, 1934) — Canary Is.
 Leptodrassex memorialis (Spassky, 1940) — Greece, Ukraine, Russia (Europe to Central Asia), Kazakhstan, Pakistan, Mongolia
 Leptodrassex simoni (Dalmas, 1919) (type) — Portugal, Spain, France, Lebanon

Leptodrassus

Leptodrassus Simon, 1878
 Leptodrassus albidus Simon, 1914 — Azores, Canary Is., Spain to Greece (Crete), Turkey, Israel
 Leptodrassus bergensis Tucker, 1923 — South Africa
 Leptodrassus croaticus Dalmas, 1919 — Croatia
 Leptodrassus diomedeus Caporiacco, 1951 — Italy
 Leptodrassus femineus (Simon, 1873) (type) — Portugal to Crete, Israel
 Leptodrassus fragilis Dalmas, 1919 — Algeria, Libya
 Leptodrassus incertus Banks, 1898 — Mexico
 Leptodrassus licentiosus Dalmas, 1919 — South Africa
 Leptodrassus punicus Dalmas, 1919 — Tunisia
 Leptodrassus strandi Caporiacco, 1947 — Ethiopia
 Leptodrassus tropicus Dalmas, 1919 — Sierra Leone

Leptopilos

Leptopilos Levy, 2009
 Leptopilos hadjissaranti (Chatzaki, 2002) — Greece (Crete)
 Leptopilos lakhish Levy, 2009 — Israel
 Leptopilos levantinus Levy, 2009 — Greece (Crete), Israel
 Leptopilos manolisi (Chatzaki, 2002) — Greece (Crete), Israel
 Leptopilos pupa (Dalmas, 1919) — Egypt
 Leptopilos tenerrimus (O. Pickard-Cambridge, 1872) (type) — Libya, Israel

Litopyllus

Litopyllus Chamberlin, 1922
 Litopyllus cubanus (Bryant, 1940) — USA, Bahama Is., Cuba
 Litopyllus realisticus (Chamberlin, 1924) — Mexico
 Litopyllus temporarius Chamberlin, 1922 (type) — USA

Lygromma

Lygromma Simon, 1893
 Lygromma anops Peck & Shear, 1987 — Ecuador (Galapagos Is.)
 Lygromma chamberlini Gertsch, 1941 — Panama, Colombia, Cuba, Hispaniola
 Lygromma domingo Platnick & Shadab, 1981 — Ecuador
 Lygromma dybasi Platnick & Shadab, 1976 — Costa Rica, Panama
 Lygromma gasnieri Brescovit & Höfer, 1993 — Brazil
 Lygromma gertschi Platnick & Shadab, 1976 — Jamaica
 Lygromma huberti Platnick & Shadab, 1976 — Venezuela, Brazil
 Lygromma kochalkai Platnick & Shadab, 1976 — Colombia
 Lygromma peckorum Platnick & Shadab, 1976 — Colombia
 Lygromma peruvianum Platnick & Shadab, 1976 — Peru
 Lygromma quindio Platnick & Shadab, 1976 — Colombia
 Lygromma senoculatum Simon, 1893 (type) — Venezuela
 Lygromma simoni (Berland, 1913) — Ecuador
 Lygromma taruma Brescovit & Bonaldo, 1998 — Brazil
 Lygromma tuxtla Platnick, 1978 — Mexico
 Lygromma valencianum Simon, 1893 — Venezuela
 Lygromma volcan Platnick & Shadab, 1981 — Panama
 Lygromma wygodzinskyi Platnick, 1978 — Colombia
 Lygromma ybyguara Rheims & Brescovit, 2004 — Brazil

Lygrommatoides

Lygrommatoides Strand, 1918
 Lygrommatoides problematica Strand, 1918 (type) — Japan

M

Macarophaeus

Macarophaeus Wunderlich, 2011
 Macarophaeus cultior (Kulczyński, 1899) — Canary Is., Madeira
 Macarophaeus insignis Wunderlich, 2011 — Canary Is.
 Macarophaeus varius (Simon, 1893) (type) — Canary Is.

Marjanus

Marjanus Chatzaki, 2018
 Marjanus platnicki (Zhang, Song & Zhu, 2001) (type) — Greece, Turkey, China

Matua

Matua Forster, 1979
 Matua festiva Forster, 1979 — New Zealand
 Matua valida Forster, 1979 (type) — New Zealand

Megamyrmaekion

Megamyrmaekion Reuss, 1834
 Megamyrmaekion algericum Simon, 1885 — Algeria, Tunisia
 Megamyrmaekion ashae Tikader & Gajbe, 1977 — India
 Megamyrmaekion austrinum Simon, 1908 — Australia (Western Australia)
 Megamyrmaekion caudatum Reuss, 1834 (type) — Tunisia, Libya, Egypt, Israel, Iran
 Megamyrmaekion hula Levy, 2009 — Israel
 Megamyrmaekion jodhpurense Gajbe, 1993 — India
 Megamyrmaekion kajalae Biswas & Biswas, 1992 — India
 Megamyrmaekion magshimim Levy, 2009 — Israel
 Megamyrmaekion nairobii Berland, 1920 — East Africa
 Megamyrmaekion schreineri Tucker, 1923 — South Africa
 Megamyrmaekion transvaalense Tucker, 1923 — South Africa
 Megamyrmaekion velox Simon, 1887 — South Africa
 Megamyrmaekion vulpinum (O. Pickard-Cambridge, 1874) — Niger, Egypt

Micaria

Micaria Westring, 1851
 Micaria aborigenica Mikhailov, 1988 — Russia (northeastern Siberia)
 Micaria aciculata Simon, 1895 — Russia (south Siberia)
 Micaria aenea Thorell, 1871 — North America, Europe, Russia (Europe to Far East), Kazakhstan
 Micaria albofasciata Hu, 2001 — China
 Micaria albovittata (Lucas, 1846) — Europe, Turkey, Caucasus, Russia (Europe to Central Asia), Iran, Turkmenistan, China
 Micaria alpina L. Koch, 1872 — USA (Alaska), Canada, Europe, Russia (Europe to Far East), Japan
 Micaria alxa Tang, Urita, Song & Zhao, 1997 — China
 Micaria beaufortia (Tucker, 1923) — South Africa
 Micaria belezma Bosmans, 2000 — Algeria
 Micaria blicki Kovblyuk & Nadolny, 2008 — Ukraine
 Micaria bonneti Schenkel, 1963 — Mongolia, China
 Micaria bosmansi Kovblyuk & Nadolny, 2008 — Ukraine, Russia (Europe)
 Micaria braendegaardi Denis, 1958 — Afghanistan
 Micaria brignolii (Bosmans & Blick, 2000) — Portugal, France
 Micaria browni Barnes, 1953 — USA
 Micaria camargo Platnick & Shadab, 1988 — Mexico
 Micaria capistrano Platnick & Shadab, 1988 — USA, Mexico
 Micaria charitonovi Mikhailov & Ponomarev, 2008 — Kazakhstan
 Micaria chrysis (Simon, 1910) — South Africa
 Micaria cimarron Platnick & Shadab, 1988 — USA
 Micaria coarctata (Lucas, 1846) — Mediterranean, Eastern Europe, Caucasus, Russia (Europe to Far East), Kazakhstan, Central Asia
 Micaria coloradensis Banks, 1896 — USA, Canada
 Micaria connexa O. Pickard-Cambridge, 1885 — China (Yarkand)
 Micaria constricta Emerton, 1894 — North America, Svalbard, Russia (Northern Europe to middle Siberia)
 Micaria corvina Simon, 1878 — Algeria, Tunisia, Israel
 Micaria croesia L. Koch, 1873 — Australia (New South Wales)
 Micaria cyrnea Brignoli, 1983 — France (Corsica), Italy, Greece
 Micaria delicatula Bryant, 1941 — USA
 Micaria deserticola Gertsch, 1933 — USA, Mexico
 Micaria dives (Lucas, 1846) — Europe, Turkey, Israel, Caucasus, Russia (Europe to Far East), Central Asia, India, China, Korea, Japan
 Micaria dives concolor (Caporiacco, 1935) — Karakorum
 Micaria donensis Ponomarev & Tsvetkov, 2006 — Russia (Europe)
 Micaria elizabethae Gertsch, 1942 — USA, Canada
 Micaria emertoni Gertsch, 1935 — North America
 Micaria faltana Bhattacharya, 1935 — India
 Micaria formicaria (Sundevall, 1831) — Europe, Turkey, Caucasus, Russia (Europe to Far East), Kazakhstan, China
 Micaria foxi Gertsch, 1933 — USA, Canada
 Micaria fulgens (Walckenaer, 1802) (type) — Europe, Caucasus, Russia (Europe to south Siberia), Central Asia, China
 Micaria funerea Simon, 1878 — Spain, France (Corsica), Bulgaria, Russia (Caucasus)
 Micaria galilaea Levy, 2009 — Israel
 Micaria gertschi Barrows & Ivie, 1942 — USA, Canada
 Micaria gomerae Strand, 1911 — Canary Is.
 Micaria gosiuta Gertsch, 1942 — USA, Mexico
 Micaria gulliae Tuneva & Esyunin, 2003 — Russia (Europe), Kazakhstan
 Micaria guttigera Simon, 1878 — Portugal, Spain, France
 Micaria guttulata (C. L. Koch, 1839) — Europe, Russia (Europe to Far East), Kazakhstan, Kyrgyzstan
 Micaria icenoglei Platnick & Shadab, 1988 — USA
 Micaria idana Platnick & Shadab, 1988 — USA, Canada
 Micaria ignea (O. Pickard-Cambridge, 1872) — Canary Is., Algeria, Spain, Greece (Crete), Cyprus, Egypt, Yemen, Israel, Syria, Iran, Central Asia
 Micaria imperiosa Gertsch, 1935 — USA, Mexico
 Micaria inornata L. Koch, 1873 — Australia
 Micaria japonica Hayashi, 1985 — Russia (Far East), Korea, Japan
 Micaria jeanae Gertsch, 1942 — USA, Mexico
 Micaria jinlin Song, Zhu & Zhang, 2004 — China
 Micaria kopetdaghensis Mikhailov, 1986 — Caucasus to Central Asia
 Micaria langtry Platnick & Shadab, 1988 — USA
 Micaria lassena Platnick & Shadab, 1988 — USA
 Micaria laticeps Emerton, 1909 — USA, Canada
 Micaria lenzi Bösenberg, 1899 — Europe, Caucasus, Russia (Europe to South and northeastern Siberia), Central Asia, China
 Micaria lindbergi Roewer, 1962 — Afghanistan
 Micaria logunovi Zhang, Song & Zhu, 2001 — China
 Micaria longipes Emerton, 1890 — North America
 Micaria longispina Emerton, 1911 — USA, Canada
 Micaria marchesii (Caporiacco, 1936) — Libya
 Micaria marusiki Zhang, Song & Zhu, 2001 — China
 Micaria medica Platnick & Shadab, 1988 — USA, Canada
 Micaria mexicana Platnick & Shadab, 1988 — Mexico
 Micaria mongunica Danilov, 1997 — Russia (south Siberia)
 Micaria mormon Gertsch, 1935 — North America
 Micaria nanella Gertsch, 1935 — USA, Mexico
 Micaria nivosa L. Koch, 1866 — Europe, Russia (Europe to south Siberia), Kazakhstan
 Micaria nye Platnick & Shadab, 1988 — USA, Mexico
 Micaria otero Platnick & Shadab, 1988 — USA
 Micaria pallens Denis, 1958 — Afghanistan
 Micaria pallida O. Pickard-Cambridge, 1885 — Tajikistan
 Micaria palliditarsa Banks, 1896 — USA, Mexico
 Micaria pallipes (Lucas, 1846) — Madeira, Mediterranean to Central Asia
 Micaria palma Platnick & Shadab, 1988 — USA
 Micaria palmgreni Wunderlich, 1980 — Finland
 Micaria paralbofasciata Song, Zhu & Zhang, 2004 — China
 Micaria pasadena Platnick & Shadab, 1988 — USA, Mexico
 Micaria porta Platnick & Shadab, 1988 — USA, Mexico
 Micaria pulcherrima Caporiacco, 1935 — India, Pakistan, Russia (south Siberia), China
 Micaria pulcherrima flava Caporiacco, 1935 — Karakorum
 Micaria pulicaria (Sundevall, 1831) — North America, Europe, Turkey, Caucasus, Russia (Europe to Far East), Central Asia, China, Japan
 Micaria punctata Banks, 1896 — USA
 Micaria riggsi Gertsch, 1942 — USA, Canada
 Micaria rossica Thorell, 1875 — North America, Europe, Turkey, Caucasus, Russia (Europe to Far East), Central Asia, Mongolia, China
 Micaria seminola Gertsch, 1942 — USA
 Micaria seymuria Tuneva, 2004 — Kazakhstan
 Micaria silesiaca L. Koch, 1875 — Europe, Caucasus, Russia (Europe to south Siberia)
 Micaria siniloana Barrion & Litsinger, 1995 — Philippines
 Micaria sociabilis Kulczyński, 1897 — Europe, Azerbaijan
 Micaria subopaca Westring, 1861 — Europe, Russia (Europe to south Siberia, Kamchatka)
 Micaria tarabaevi Mikhailov, 1988 — Kazakhstan
 Micaria tersissima Simon, 1910 — South Africa
 Micaria triangulosa Gertsch, 1935 — USA
 Micaria triguttata Simon, 1884 — Spain, France, Algeria
 Micaria tripunctata Holm, 1978 — USA (Alaska), Canada, Northern Europe, Russia (Europe to Far East)
 Micaria tuvensis Danilov, 1993 — Russia (Central Asia, south Siberia), Kazakhstan, China
 Micaria utahna Gertsch, 1933 — USA
 Micaria vinnula Gertsch & Davis, 1936 — USA
 Micaria violens Oliger, 1983 — Russia (Far East)
 Micaria xiningensis Hu, 2001 — China
 Micaria yeniseica Marusik & Koponen, 2002 — Russia (middle Siberia)
 Micaria yushuensis Hu, 2001 — China
 Micaria zonsteini (Mikhailov, 2016) — Azerbaijan, Kyrgyzstan

Microdrassus

Microdrassus Dalmas, 1919
 Microdrassus inaudax (Simon, 1898) (type) — Seychelles

Microsa

Microsa Platnick & Shadab, 1977
 Microsa chickeringi Platnick & Shadab, 1977 (type) — Virgin Is.
 Microsa cubitas Alayón & Platnick, 1993 — Cuba
 Microsa gertschi Platnick, 1978 — Bahama Is.

Micythus

Micythus Thorell, 1897
 Micythus anopsis Deeleman-Reinhold, 2001 — Thailand
 Micythus pictus Thorell, 1897 (type) — Myanmar, Indonesia (Borneo)
 Micythus rangunensis (Thorell, 1895) — Myanmar, Indonesia (Sumatra, Borneo)

Minosia

Minosia Dalmas, 1921
 Minosia assimilis Caporiacco, 1941 — Ethiopia, Uganda
 Minosia berlandi Lessert, 1929 — Congo
 Minosia bicalcarata (Simon, 1882) — Yemen
 Minosia clypeolaria (Simon, 1907) — Guinea-Bissau
 Minosia eburneensis Jézéquel, 1965 — Ivory Coast
 Minosia irrugata (Simon, 1907) — Guinea-Bissau
 Minosia karakumensis (Spassky, 1939) — Turkmenistan
 Minosia lynx (Simon, 1886) — Senegal
 Minosia pharao Dalmas, 1921 — Egypt, Israel
 Minosia pharao occidentalis Dalmas, 1921 — Algeria
 Minosia santschii Dalmas, 1921 — Tunisia, Libya
 Minosia senegaliensis Dalmas, 1921 — Senegal
 Minosia simeonica Levy, 1995 — Israel, Iran
 Minosia spinosissima (Simon, 1878) (type) — Spain, France, Israel

Minosiella

Minosiella Dalmas, 1921
 Minosiella intermedia Denis, 1958 — Central Asia, Afghanistan, Iran
 Minosiella mediocris Dalmas, 1921 (type) — Tunisia, Algeria, Egypt, Israel
 Minosiella pallida (L. Koch, 1875) — Somalia, Yemen
 Minosiella perimensis Dalmas, 1921 — Yemen
 Minosiella pharia Dalmas, 1921 — Libya, Egypt, Israel
 Minosiella spinigera (Simon, 1882) — Yemen

Molycria

Molycria Simon, 1887
 Molycria amphi Platnick & Baehr, 2006 — Australia (Queensland)
 Molycria broadwater Platnick & Baehr, 2006 — Australia (Queensland, New South Wales)
 Molycria bulburin Platnick & Baehr, 2006 — Australia (Queensland)
 Molycria bundjalung Platnick & Baehr, 2006 — Australia (New South Wales)
 Molycria burwelli Platnick & Baehr, 2006 — Australia (Queensland)
 Molycria canonba Platnick & Baehr, 2006 — Australia (Queensland, New South Wales)
 Molycria cleveland Platnick & Baehr, 2006 — Australia (Queensland)
 Molycria cooki Platnick & Baehr, 2006 — Australia (Queensland)
 Molycria dalby Platnick & Baehr, 2006 — Australia (Queensland, New South Wales)
 Molycria daviesae Platnick & Baehr, 2006 — Australia (Queensland)
 Molycria dawson Platnick & Baehr, 2006 — Australia (Queensland)
 Molycria drummond Platnick & Baehr, 2006 — Australia (Queensland)
 Molycria goanna Platnick & Baehr, 2006 — Australia (Queensland, New South Wales)
 Molycria grayi Platnick & Baehr, 2006 — Australia (Queensland, New South Wales, Lord Howe Is.)
 Molycria isla Platnick & Baehr, 2006 — Australia (Queensland)
 Molycria kaputar Platnick & Baehr, 2006 — Australia (New South Wales)
 Molycria mammosa (O. Pickard-Cambridge, 1874) (type) — Australia (New South Wales, Capital Territory)
 Molycria mcleani Platnick & Baehr, 2006 — Australia (Queensland)
 Molycria milledgei Platnick & Baehr, 2006 — Australia (New South Wales)
 Molycria moffatt Platnick & Baehr, 2006 — Australia (Queensland)
 Molycria monteithi Platnick & Baehr, 2006 — Australia (Queensland)
 Molycria moranbah Platnick & Baehr, 2006 — Australia (Queensland)
 Molycria nipping Platnick & Baehr, 2006 — Australia (Queensland)
 Molycria quadricauda (Simon, 1908) — Southern Australia
 Molycria raveni Platnick & Baehr, 2006 — Australia (Queensland)
 Molycria robert Platnick & Baehr, 2006 — Australia (Queensland)
 Molycria smithae Platnick & Baehr, 2006 — Australia (New South Wales)
 Molycria stanisici Platnick & Baehr, 2006 — Australia (Queensland)
 Molycria taroom Platnick & Baehr, 2006 — Australia (Queensland)
 Molycria thompsoni Platnick & Baehr, 2006 — Australia (Queensland)
 Molycria tooloombah Platnick & Baehr, 2006 — Australia (Queensland)
 Molycria upstart Platnick & Baehr, 2006 — Australia (Queensland)
 Molycria vokes Platnick & Baehr, 2006 — Australia (Western Australia, Northern Territory, South Australia)
 Molycria wallacei Platnick & Baehr, 2006 — Australia (Queensland)
 Molycria wardeni Platnick & Baehr, 2006 — Australia (Queensland)
 Molycria wrightae Platnick & Baehr, 2006 — Australia (Queensland)

Montebello

Montebello Hogg, 1914
 Montebello tenuis Hogg, 1914 (type) — Australia (Western Australia)

Moreno

Moreno Mello-Leitão, 1940
 Moreno chacabuco Platnick, Shadab & Sorkin, 2005 — Chile
 Moreno chivato Platnick, Shadab & Sorkin, 2005 — Chile
 Moreno grande Platnick, Shadab & Sorkin, 2005 — Chile
 Moreno morenoi Mello-Leitão, 1940 (type) — Argentina
 Moreno neuquen Platnick, Shadab & Sorkin, 2005 — Argentina
 Moreno ramirezi Platnick, Shadab & Sorkin, 2005 — Argentina

Myandra

Myandra Simon, 1887
 Myandra bicincta Simon, 1908 — Australia
 Myandra cambridgei Simon, 1887 (type) — Australia
 Myandra myall Platnick & Baehr, 2006 — Australia (Queensland to Tasmania)
 Myandra tinline Platnick & Baehr, 2006 — Southern Australia

N

Namundra

Namundra Platnick & Bird, 2007
 Namundra brandberg Platnick & Bird, 2007 — Namibia
 Namundra griffinae Platnick & Bird, 2007 — Namibia
 Namundra kleynjansi Platnick & Bird, 2007 — Namibia
 Namundra leechi Platnick & Bird, 2007 — Angola

Nauhea

Nauhea Forster, 1979
 Nauhea tapa Forster, 1979 (type) — New Zealand

Neodrassex

Neodrassex Ott, 2012
 Neodrassex aureus Ott, 2012 (type) — Brazil, Argentina
 Neodrassex cachimbo Ott, 2013 — Brazil
 Neodrassex ibirapuita Ott, 2013 — Brazil
 Neodrassex iguatemi Ott, 2012 — Brazil
 Neodrassex nordeste Ott, 2013 — Brazil

Neozimiris

Neozimiris Simon, 1903
 Neozimiris chickeringi Platnick & Shadab, 1976 — Panama
 Neozimiris crinis Platnick & Shadab, 1976 — Mexico
 Neozimiris escandoni Müller, 1987 — Colombia
 Neozimiris exuma Platnick & Shadab, 1976 — Bahama Is.
 Neozimiris levii Platnick & Shadab, 1976 — Curaçao
 Neozimiris nuda Platnick & Shadab, 1976 — Puerto Rico
 Neozimiris pinta Platnick & Shadab, 1976 — Ecuador (Galapagos Is.)
 Neozimiris pinzon Platnick & Shadab, 1976 — Ecuador (Galapagos Is.)
 Neozimiris pubescens (Banks, 1898) (type) — USA, Mexico

Nodocion

Nodocion Chamberlin, 1922
 Nodocion eclecticus Chamberlin, 1924 — North America
 Nodocion floridanus (Banks, 1896) — USA, Mexico
 Nodocion mateonus Chamberlin, 1922 (type) — USA
 Nodocion rufithoracicus Worley, 1928 — USA, Canada
 Nodocion solanensis Tikader & Gajbe, 1977 — India
 Nodocion tikaderi (Gajbe, 1993) — India
 Nodocion utus (Chamberlin, 1936) — USA, Mexico
 Nodocion voluntarius (Chamberlin, 1919) — North America

Nomindra

Nomindra Platnick & Baehr, 2006
 Nomindra arenaria Platnick & Baehr, 2006 — Australia (Northern Territory)
 Nomindra barlee Platnick & Baehr, 2006 — Australia (Western Australia)
 Nomindra berrimah Platnick & Baehr, 2006 — Australia (Northern Territory)
 Nomindra cocklebiddy Platnick & Baehr, 2006 — Australia (Western Australia)
 Nomindra cooma Platnick & Baehr, 2006 — Australia (Western Australia)
 Nomindra fisheri Platnick & Baehr, 2006 — Australia (Northern Territory)
 Nomindra flavipes (Simon, 1908) — Australia (Western Australia, South Australia)
 Nomindra gregory Platnick & Baehr, 2006 — Australia (Western Australia, Northern Territory)
 Nomindra indulkana Platnick & Baehr, 2006 — Australia (Western Australia, South Australia)
 Nomindra jarrnarm Platnick & Baehr, 2006 — Australia (Western Australia, Northern Territory)
 Nomindra kinchega Platnick & Baehr, 2006 (type) — Australia (South Australia, Queensland to Victoria)
 Nomindra leeuweni Platnick & Baehr, 2006 — Southern Australia
 Nomindra ormiston Platnick & Baehr, 2006 — Australia (Northern Territory, South Australia)
 Nomindra thatch Platnick & Baehr, 2006 — Australia (Queensland)
 Nomindra woodstock Platnick & Baehr, 2006 — Australia (Western Australia)
 Nomindra yeni Platnick & Baehr, 2006 — Australia (Western Australia to Queensland)

Nomisia

Nomisia Dalmas, 1921
 Nomisia aussereri (L. Koch, 1872) — Mediterranean, Eastern Europe, Turkey, Middle East, Caucasus, Russia (Europe to south Siberia), Kazakhstan, Central Asia, China
 Nomisia australis Dalmas, 1921 — South Africa
 Nomisia castanea Dalmas, 1921 — Algeria, Tunisia, Libya
 Nomisia celerrima (Simon, 1914) — Spain, France
 Nomisia chordivulvata (Strand, 1906) — Ethiopia, Somalia
 Nomisia conigera (Spassky, 1941) — Turkey, Caucasus, Kazakhstan, Central Asia
 Nomisia dalmasi Lessert, 1929 — Congo
 Nomisia excerpta (O. Pickard-Cambridge, 1872) — Canary Is. to Middle East
 Nomisia exornata (C. L. Koch, 1839) (type) — Europe to Central Asia
 Nomisia flavimana Denis, 1937 — Algeria
 Nomisia fortis Dalmas, 1921 — Canary Is.
 Nomisia frenata (Purcell, 1908) — South Africa
 Nomisia gomerensis Wunderlich, 2011 — Canary Is.
 Nomisia graciliembolus Wunderlich, 2011 — Canary Is.
 Nomisia harpax (O. Pickard-Cambridge, 1874) — India
 Nomisia kabuliana Roewer, 1961 — Afghanistan
 Nomisia levyi Chatzaki, 2010 — Greece
 Nomisia molendinaria (L. Koch, 1866) — Croatia, Georgia
 Nomisia monardi Lessert, 1933 — Angola
 Nomisia montenegrina Giltay, 1932 — Montenegro
 Nomisia musiva (Simon, 1889) — Canary Is.
 Nomisia negebensis Levy, 1995 — Turkey, Israel, Iran
 Nomisia notia Dalmas, 1921 — South Africa
 Nomisia orientalis Dalmas, 1921 — Turkey
 Nomisia palaestina (O. Pickard-Cambridge, 1872) — Greece, Turkey, Syria, Israel
 Nomisia peloponnesiaca Chatzaki, 2010 — Greece
 Nomisia perpusilla Dalmas, 1921 — Spain
 Nomisia poecilipes Caporiacco, 1939 — Ethiopia
 Nomisia punctata (Kulczyński, 1901) — Ethiopia
 Nomisia recepta (Pavesi, 1880) — Tunisia, Algeria, France (mainland, Corsica), Italy (mainland, Sicily), Malta, Cyprus
 Nomisia ripariensis (O. Pickard-Cambridge, 1872) — Bulgaria, Greece, Crete, Turkey to Azerbaijan
 Nomisia satulla (Simon, 1909) — Ethiopia
 Nomisia scioana (Pavesi, 1883) — Ethiopia
 Nomisia simplex (Kulczyński, 1901) — Ethiopia
 Nomisia tingitana Dalmas, 1921 — Morocco
 Nomisia transvaalica Dalmas, 1921 — South Africa
 Nomisia tubula (Tucker, 1923) — Angola, South Africa
 Nomisia uncinata Jézéquel, 1965 — Ivory Coast
 Nomisia varia (Tucker, 1923) — South Africa

Nopyllus

Nopyllus Ott, 2014
 Nopyllus isabelae (Brescovit & Lise, 1993) (type) — Brazil
 Nopyllus vicente Ott, 2014 — Brazil

Notiodrassus

Notiodrassus Bryant, 1935
 Notiodrassus distinctus Bryant, 1935 (type) — New Zealand
 Notiodrassus fiordensis Forster, 1979 — New Zealand

O

Odontodrassus

Odontodrassus Jézéquel, 1965
 Odontodrassus aphanes (Thorell, 1897) — Seychelles, Myanmar to Japan, New Caledonia, French Polynesia. Introduced to Jamaica
 Odontodrassus aravaensis Levy, 1999 — Israel, Egypt
 Odontodrassus bicolor Jézéquel, 1965 — Ivory Coast
 Odontodrassus hondoensis (Saito, 1939) — Russia (Far East), China, Korea, Japan
 Odontodrassus mundulus (O. Pickard-Cambridge, 1872) — Tunisia to Israel, Karakorum
 Odontodrassus muralis Deeleman-Reinhold, 2001 — Thailand, China, Indonesia (Sulawesi, Lombok)
 Odontodrassus nigritibialis Jézéquel, 1965 (type) — Ivory Coast
 Odontodrassus yunnanensis (Schenkel, 1963) — China

Oltacloea

Oltacloea Mello-Leitão, 1940
 Oltacloea beltraoae Brescovit & Ramos, 2003 — Brazil
 Oltacloea mutilata Mello-Leitão, 1940 (type) — Argentina
 Oltacloea ribaslangei Bonaldo & Brescovit, 1997 — Brazil

Orodrassus

Orodrassus Chamberlin, 1922
 Orodrassus assimilis (Banks, 1895) — USA
 Orodrassus canadensis Platnick & Shadab, 1975 — USA, Canada
 Orodrassus coloradensis (Emerton, 1877) (type) — USA, Canada

P

Parabonna

Parabonna Mello-Leitão, 1947
 Parabonna goffergei Mello-Leitão, 1947 (type) — Brazil

Paracymbiomma

Paracymbiomma Rodrigues, Cizauskas & Rheims, 2018
 Paracymbiomma angelim Rodrigues, Cizauskas & Rheims, 2018 (type) — Brazil
 Paracymbiomma bocaina Rodrigues, Cizauskas & Rheims, 2018 — Brazil
 Paracymbiomma caecus Rodrigues, Cizauskas & Rheims, 2018 — Brazil
 Paracymbiomma carajas Rodrigues, Cizauskas & Rheims, 2018 — Brazil
 Paracymbiomma doisirmaos Rodrigues, Cizauskas & Rheims, 2018 — Brazil
 Paracymbiomma pauferrense Rodrigues, Cizauskas & Rheims, 2018 — Brazil

Parasyrisca

Parasyrisca Schenkel, 1963
 Parasyrisca alai Ovtsharenko, Platnick & Marusik, 1995 — Kyrgyzstan, Pakistan
 Parasyrisca alexeevi Ovtsharenko, Platnick & Marusik, 1995 — Russia (Caucasus)
 Parasyrisca altaica Ovtsharenko, Platnick & Marusik, 1995 — Kazakhstan
 Parasyrisca andarbag Ovtsharenko, Platnick & Marusik, 1995 — Tajikistan
 Parasyrisca andreevae Ovtsharenko, Platnick & Marusik, 1995 — Tajikistan
 Parasyrisca anzobica Ovtsharenko, Platnick & Marusik, 1995 — Tajikistan
 Parasyrisca arrabonica Szinetár & Eichardt, 2009 — Hungary
 Parasyrisca asiatica Ovtsharenko, Platnick & Marusik, 1995 — Russia (south Siberia), Mongolia
 Parasyrisca balcarica Ovtsharenko, Platnick & Marusik, 1995 — Russia (Caucasus)
 Parasyrisca belengish Ovtsharenko, Platnick & Marusik, 1995 — Russia (south Siberia)
 Parasyrisca belukha Ovtsharenko, Platnick & Marusik, 1995 — Russia (south Siberia)
 Parasyrisca birikchul Ovtsharenko, Platnick & Marusik, 1995 — Russia (south Siberia)
 Parasyrisca breviceps (Kroneberg, 1875) — Tajikistan
 Parasyrisca bucklei Marusik & Fomichev, 2010 — Russia (south Siberia)
 Parasyrisca caucasica Ovtsharenko, Platnick & Marusik, 1995 — Russia (Caucasus)
 Parasyrisca chikatunovi Ovtsharenko, Platnick & Marusik, 1995 — Tajikistan
 Parasyrisca gissarika Ovtsharenko, Platnick & Marusik, 1995 — Tajikistan
 Parasyrisca golyakovi Marusik & Fomichev, 2016 — Russia (south Siberia)
 Parasyrisca guzeripli Ovtsharenko, Platnick & Marusik, 1995 — Russia (Caucasus)
 Parasyrisca heimeri Ovtsharenko, Platnick & Marusik, 1995 — Mongolia
 Parasyrisca helanshan Tang & Zhao, 1998 — China
 Parasyrisca hippai Ovtsharenko, Platnick & Marusik, 1995 — Russia (south Siberia)
 Parasyrisca holmi Ovtsharenko, Platnick & Marusik, 1995 — Russia (Far East, east Siberia)
 Parasyrisca iskander Ovtsharenko, Platnick & Marusik, 1995 — Tajikistan
 Parasyrisca khubsugul Ovtsharenko, Platnick & Marusik, 1995 — Mongolia
 Parasyrisca koksu Ovtsharenko, Platnick & Marusik, 1995 — Kyrgyzstan
 Parasyrisca kosachevi Fomichev, Marusik & Sidorov, 2018 — Mongolia
 Parasyrisca kurgan Ovtsharenko, Platnick & Marusik, 1995 — Kyrgyzstan
 Parasyrisca kyzylart Ovtsharenko, Platnick & Marusik, 1995 — Kyrgyzstan
 Parasyrisca logunovi Ovtsharenko, Platnick & Marusik, 1995 — Russia (south Siberia)
 Parasyrisca marusiki Kovblyuk, 2003 — Ukraine
 Parasyrisca mikhailovi Ovtsharenko, Platnick & Marusik, 1995 — Russia (Caucasus)
 Parasyrisca narynica Ovtsharenko, Platnick & Marusik, 1995 — Kyrgyzstan, Tajikistan
 Parasyrisca orites (Chamberlin & Gertsch, 1940) — USA, Canada
 Parasyrisca otmek Ovtsharenko, Platnick & Marusik, 1995 — Kyrgyzstan
 Parasyrisca paironica Ovtsharenko, Platnick & Marusik, 1995 — Tajikistan
 Parasyrisca pamirica Ovtsharenko, Platnick & Marusik, 1995 — Tajikistan
 Parasyrisca potanini Schenkel, 1963 (type) — Russia (south Siberia), Mongolia, China
 Parasyrisca pshartica Ovtsharenko, Platnick & Marusik, 1995 — Tajikistan
 Parasyrisca schenkeli Ovtsharenko & Marusik, 1988 — Kazakhstan, Mongolia, China
 Parasyrisca shakhristanica Ovtsharenko, Platnick & Marusik, 1995 — Tajikistan
 Parasyrisca sollers (Simon, 1895) — Mongolia, China
 Parasyrisca songi Marusik & Fritzén, 2009 — China
 Parasyrisca sulaki Fomichev, Marusik & Sidorov, 2018 — Kazakhstan
 Parasyrisca susamyr Ovtsharenko, Platnick & Marusik, 1995 — Kyrgyzstan
 Parasyrisca terskei Ovtsharenko, Platnick & Marusik, 1995 — Kyrgyzstan
 Parasyrisca tronovorum Fomichev, Marusik & Sidorov, 2018 — Mongolia
 Parasyrisca turkenica Ovtsharenko, Platnick & Marusik, 1995 — Turkey
 Parasyrisca tyshchenkoi Ovtsharenko, Platnick & Marusik, 1995 — Russia (south and east Siberia)
 Parasyrisca ulykpani Ovtsharenko, Platnick & Marusik, 1995 — Russia (south Siberia), Mongolia
 Parasyrisca vakhanski Ovtsharenko, Platnick & Marusik, 1995 — Tajikistan
 Parasyrisca vinosa (Simon, 1878) — Europe (Alps, Pyrenees)
 Parasyrisca volynkini Fomichev, 2016 — Russia (south Siberia)
 Parasyrisca vorobica Ovtsharenko, Platnick & Marusik, 1995 — Tajikistan

Phaeocedus

Phaeocedus Simon, 1893
 Phaeocedus braccatus (L. Koch, 1866) (type) — Europe, Turkey, Caucasus, Russia (Europe to Far East), Kazakhstan, Central Asia, China, Japan
 Phaeocedus braccatus jugorum Simon, 1914 — France
 Phaeocedus fedotovi Charitonov, 1946 — Uzbekistan
 Phaeocedus haribhaiius Patel & Patel, 1975 — India
 Phaeocedus hebraeus Levy, 1999 — Israel
 Phaeocedus mikha Levy, 2009 — Israel, Portugal
 Phaeocedus mosambaensis Tikader, 1964 — Nepal
 Phaeocedus nicobarensis Tikader, 1977 — India (Nicobar Is.)
 Phaeocedus parvus O. Pickard-Cambridge, 1906 — probably India
 Phaeocedus poonaensis Tikader, 1982 — India

Plutonodomus

Plutonodomus Cooke, 1964
 Plutonodomus kungwensis Cooke, 1964 (type) — Tanzania

Poecilochroa

Poecilochroa Westring, 1874
 Poecilochroa albomaculata (Lucas, 1846) — Western Mediterranean
 Poecilochroa alcala Barrion & Litsinger, 1995 — Philippines
 Poecilochroa anomala (Hewitt, 1915) — South Africa
 Poecilochroa antineae Fage, 1929 — Mali
 Poecilochroa barmani Tikader, 1982 — India
 Poecilochroa behni Thorell, 1891 — India (Nicobar Is.)
 Poecilochroa bifasciata Banks, 1902 — Ecuador (Galapagos Is.)
 Poecilochroa capensis Strand, 1909 — South Africa
 Poecilochroa carinata Caporiacco, 1947 — Uganda
 Poecilochroa dayamibrookiana Barrion & Litsinger, 1995 — Philippines
 Poecilochroa devendrai Gajbe & Rane, 1985 — India
 Poecilochroa faradjensis Lessert, 1929 — Congo
 Poecilochroa furcata Simon, 1914 — France, Italy, Greece
 Poecilochroa golan Levy, 1999 — Israel
 Poecilochroa haplostyla Simon, 1907 — São Tomé and Príncipe
 Poecilochroa incompta (Pavesi, 1880) — Tunisia
 Poecilochroa insularis Kulczyński, 1911 — Indonesia (Java)
 Poecilochroa involuta Tucker, 1923 — South Africa
 Poecilochroa joreungensis Paik, 1992 — Korea
 Poecilochroa latefasciata Simon, 1893 — Peru
 Poecilochroa loricata Kritscher, 1996 — Malta
 Poecilochroa malagassa Strand, 1907 — Madagascar
 Poecilochroa parangunifasciata Barrion & Litsinger, 1995 — Philippines
 Poecilochroa patricia (Simon, 1878) — France (Corsica)
 Poecilochroa pauciaculeis Caporiacco, 1947 — East Africa
 Poecilochroa perversa Simon, 1914 — France
 Poecilochroa phyllobia (Thorell, 1871) — Italy
 Poecilochroa pugnax (O. Pickard-Cambridge, 1874) — Libya, Egypt, Ethiopia, Israel
 Poecilochroa rollini Berland, 1933 — French Polynesia (Marquesas Is., Tuamotu)
 Poecilochroa sedula (Simon, 1897) — India
 Poecilochroa senilis (O. Pickard-Cambridge, 1872) — France (Corsica) to Turkmenistan
 Poecilochroa senilis auspex (Simon, 1878) — Spain, France
 Poecilochroa taborensis Levy, 1999 — Israel, Cyprus, Greece, Portugal
 Poecilochroa taeguensis Paik, 1992 — Korea
 Poecilochroa tikaderi Patel, 1989 — India
 Poecilochroa tridotus Caleb & Mathai, 2013 — India
 Poecilochroa trifasciata Mello-Leitão, 1918 — Brazil
 Poecilochroa variana (C. L. Koch, 1839) (type) — Europe to Central Asia
 Poecilochroa viduata (Pavesi, 1883) — Ethiopia
 Poecilochroa vittata Kulczyński, 1911 — Indonesia (Java)

Prodida

Prodida Dalmas, 1919
 Prodida longiventris Dalmas, 1919 (type) — Philippines
 Prodida stella Saaristo, 2002 — Seychelles

Prodidomus

Prodidomus Hentz, 1847
 Prodidomus amaranthinus (Lucas, 1846) — Mediterranean
 Prodidomus aurantiacus Simon, 1890 — Yemen
 Prodidomus beattyi Platnick, 1977 — Australia (Western Australia, Northern Territory)
 Prodidomus bendee Platnick & Baehr, 2006 — Australia (Queensland)
 Prodidomus bicolor Denis, 1957 — Sudan
 Prodidomus birmanicus Thorell, 1897 — Myanmar
 Prodidomus bryantae Alayón, 1995 — Cuba
 Prodidomus capensis Purcell, 1904 — South Africa
 Prodidomus chaperi (Simon, 1884) — India
 Prodidomus clarki Cooke, 1964 — Ascension Is.
 Prodidomus dalmasi Berland, 1920 — Kenya
 Prodidomus djibutensis Dalmas, 1919 — Somalia
 Prodidomus domesticus Lessert, 1938 — Congo
 Prodidomus duffeyi Cooke, 1964 — Ascension Is.
 Prodidomus flavidus (Simon, 1884) — Algeria
 Prodidomus flavipes Lawrence, 1952 — South Africa
 Prodidomus flavus Platnick & Baehr, 2006 — Australia (Queensland)
 Prodidomus geniculosus Dalmas, 1919 — Tunisia
 Prodidomus granulosus Cooke, 1964 — Rwanda
 Prodidomus hispanicus Dalmas, 1919 — Spain, Greece
 Prodidomus kimberley Platnick & Baehr, 2006 — Australia (Western Australia, Northern Territory)
 Prodidomus lampei Strand, 1915 — Namibia
 Prodidomus lampeli Cooke, 1964 — Ethiopia
 Prodidomus latebricola Cooke, 1964 — Tanzania
 Prodidomus margala Platnick, 1976 — Pakistan
 Prodidomus maximus Lessert, 1936 — Mozambique
 Prodidomus nigellus Simon, 1890 — Yemen
 Prodidomus nigricaudus Simon, 1893 — Venezuela
 Prodidomus opacithorax Simon, 1893 — Venezuela
 Prodidomus palkai Cooke, 1972 — India
 Prodidomus papavanasanemensis Cooke, 1972 — India
 Prodidomus purpurascens Purcell, 1904 — South Africa
 Prodidomus purpureus Simon, 1907 — West Africa
 Prodidomus redikorzevi Spassky, 1940 — Turkey, Azerbaijan, Iran, Kazakhstan, Turkmenistan
 Prodidomus reticulatus Lawrence, 1927 — Namibia
 Prodidomus revocatus Cooke, 1964 — Mauritius
 Prodidomus robustus Dalmas, 1919 — Ethiopia
 Prodidomus rodolphianus Dalmas, 1919 — East Africa
 Prodidomus rollasoni Cooke, 1964 — Libya
 Prodidomus rufus Hentz, 1847 (type) — Israel, China, Japan, New Caledonia, USA, Cuba, Argentina, Chile, St. Helena
 Prodidomus saharanpurensis (Tikader, 1982) — India
 Prodidomus sampeyi Platnick & Baehr, 2006 — Australia (Western Australia)
 Prodidomus seemani Platnick & Baehr, 2006 — Australia (Queensland)
 Prodidomus simoni Dalmas, 1919 — South Africa
 Prodidomus singulus Suman, 1967 — Hawaii
 Prodidomus sirohi Platnick, 1976 — India
 Prodidomus tigrinus Dalmas, 1919 — West Africa
 Prodidomus tirumalai Cooke, 1972 — India
 Prodidomus venkateswarai Cooke, 1972 — India
 Prodidomus watongwensis Cooke, 1964 — Tanzania
 Prodidomus woodleigh Platnick & Baehr, 2006 — Australia (Western Australia)
 Prodidomus wunderlichi Deeleman-Reinhold, 2001 — Thailand
 Prodidomus yorke Platnick & Baehr, 2006 — Australia (Queensland)

Pseudodrassus

Pseudodrassus Caporiacco, 1935
 Pseudodrassus pichoni Schenkel, 1963 — China
 Pseudodrassus quadridentatus (Caporiacco, 1928) — Libya
 Pseudodrassus ricasolii Caporiacco, 1935 (type) — Turkey
 Pseudodrassus scorteccii Caporiacco, 1936 — Libya

Pterotricha

Pterotricha Kulczyński, 1903
 Pterotricha aethiopica (L. Koch, 1875) — Ethiopia
 Pterotricha algerica Dalmas, 1921 — Algeria, Libya
 Pterotricha arabica Zamani, 2018 — United Arab Emirates
 Pterotricha arcifera (Simon, 1882) — Yemen
 Pterotricha argentosa Charitonov, 1946 — Uzbekistan
 Pterotricha arzhantsevi Fomichev, Marusik & Koponen, 2018 — Iraq
 Pterotricha auris (Tucker, 1923) — South Africa
 Pterotricha cambridgei (L. Koch, 1872) — Syria, Israel
 Pterotricha chazaliae (Simon, 1895) — Morocco, Mauritania, Algeria, Israel
 Pterotricha conspersa (O. Pickard-Cambridge, 1872) — Libya, Egypt, Israel
 Pterotricha dalmasi Fage, 1929 — Algeria, Egypt, Sudan, Israel, Jordan, Saudi Arabia, United Arab Emirates, Iran?
 Pterotricha djibutensis Dalmas, 1921 — Somalia
 Pterotricha egens Denis, 1966 — Libya
 Pterotricha engediensis Levy, 1995 — Israel
 Pterotricha esyunini Zamani, 2018 — United Arab Emirates
 Pterotricha insolita Dalmas, 1921 — Algeria
 Pterotricha kochi (O. Pickard-Cambridge, 1872) — Turkey, Lebanon, Syria, Israel
 Pterotricha kovblyuki Zamani & Marusik, 2018 — United Arab Emirates, Iran
 Pterotricha lentiginosa (C. L. Koch, 1837) (type) — Balkans, Greece, Turkey, Ukraine
 Pterotricha lesserti Dalmas, 1921 — Turkey, Egypt, Israel, Saudi Arabia
 Pterotricha levantina Levy, 1995 — Israel
 Pterotricha linnaei (Audouin, 1826) — Egypt
 Pterotricha lutata (O. Pickard-Cambridge, 1872) — Lebanon, Israel
 Pterotricha marginalis (Tucker, 1923) — South Africa
 Pterotricha mauritanica Denis, 1945 — Mauritania
 Pterotricha montana Zamani & Marusik, 2018 — Iran
 Pterotricha nadolnyi Zamani, 2018 — United Arab Emirates
 Pterotricha nomas (Thorell, 1875) — Russia (Europe)
 Pterotricha parasyriaca Levy, 1995 — Israel
 Pterotricha paupercula Denis, 1966 — Libya
 Pterotricha pavlovskyi Spassky, 1952 — Tajikistan
 Pterotricha procera (O. Pickard-Cambridge, 1874) — Egypt, Israel
 Pterotricha pseudoparasyriaca Nuruyeva & Huseynov, 2016 — Azerbaijan, Iran
 Pterotricha punctifera Dalmas, 1921 — Yemen
 Pterotricha quagga (Pavesi, 1884) — Ethiopia
 Pterotricha saga (Dönitz & Strand, 1906) — Japan
 Pterotricha schaefferi (Audouin, 1826) — Libya, Egypt, Sudan, Israel
 Pterotricha simoni Dalmas, 1921 — Spain
 Pterotricha sinoniae Caporiacco, 1953 — Italy
 Pterotricha somaliensis Dalmas, 1921 — Somalia
 Pterotricha stevensi Zamani, 2018 — United Arab Emirates
 Pterotricha strandi Spassky, 1936 — Iran, Turkmenistan, Afghanistan, India
 Pterotricha syriaca Dalmas, 1921 — Syria
 Pterotricha vicina Dalmas, 1921 — Algeria, Libya

Pterotrichina

Pterotrichina Dalmas, 1921
 Pterotrichina elegans Dalmas, 1921 (type) — Algeria, Tunisia
 Pterotrichina nova Caporiacco, 1934 — Karakorum

Purcelliana

Purcelliana Cooke, 1964
 Purcelliana problematica Cooke, 1964 (type) — South Africa

S

Sanitubius

Sanitubius Kamura, 2001
 Sanitubius anatolicus (Kamura, 1989) — China, Korea, Japan

Scopoides

Scopoides Platnick, 1989
 Scopoides asceticus (Chamberlin, 1924) — Mexico
 Scopoides bryantae (Platnick & Shadab, 1976) — USA, Mexico
 Scopoides cambridgei (Gertsch & Davis, 1940) — USA, Mexico
 Scopoides catharius (Chamberlin, 1922) (type) — USA
 Scopoides gertschi (Platnick, 1978) — USA
 Scopoides gyirongensis Hu, 2001 — China
 Scopoides kastoni (Platnick & Shadab, 1976) — USA, Mexico
 Scopoides kuljitae (Tikader, 1982) — India
 Scopoides maitraiae (Tikader & Gajbe, 1977) — India
 Scopoides naturalisticus (Chamberlin, 1924) — USA, Mexico
 Scopoides nesiotes (Chamberlin, 1924) — USA, Mexico
 Scopoides ochraceus (F. O. Pickard-Cambridge, 1899) — Mexico
 Scopoides pritiae (Tikader, 1982) — India
 Scopoides rostratus (Platnick & Shadab, 1976) — Mexico
 Scopoides samarae Gawande & Bodkhe, 2018 — India
 Scopoides santiago (Platnick & Shadab, 1976) — Mexico
 Scopoides tikaderi (Gajbe, 1987) — India
 Scopoides tlacolula (Platnick & Shadab, 1976) — Mexico
 Scopoides wanglangensis Yuan, Zhao & Zhang, 2019 — China
 Scopoides xizangensis Hu, 2001 — China

Scotocesonia

Scotocesonia Caporiacco, 1947
 Scotocesonia demerarae Caporiacco, 1947 (type) — Guyana

Scotognapha

Scotognapha Dalmas, 1920
 Scotognapha arcuata Wunderlich, 2011 — Canary Is.
 Scotognapha atomaria Dalmas, 1920 — Canary Is.
 Scotognapha brunnea Schmidt, 1980 — Canary Is.
 Scotognapha canaricola (Strand, 1911) — Canary Is.
 Scotognapha convexa (Simon, 1883) (type) — Canary Is.
 Scotognapha costacalma Platnick, Ovtsharenko & Murphy, 2001 — Canary Is.
 Scotognapha galletas Platnick, Ovtsharenko & Murphy, 2001 — Canary Is.
 Scotognapha haria Platnick, Ovtsharenko & Murphy, 2001 — Canary Is.
 Scotognapha juangrandica Platnick, Ovtsharenko & Murphy, 2001 — Canary Is.
 Scotognapha medano Platnick, Ovtsharenko & Murphy, 2001 — Canary Is.
 Scotognapha paivani (Blackwall, 1864) — Selvagens Is.
 Scotognapha taganana Platnick, Ovtsharenko & Murphy, 2001 — Canary Is.
 Scotognapha teideensis (Wunderlich, 1992) — Canary Is.
 Scotognapha wunderlichi Platnick, Ovtsharenko & Murphy, 2001 — Canary Is.

Scotophaeus

Scotophaeus Simon, 1893
 Scotophaeus aculeatus Simon, 1914 — France
 Scotophaeus affinis Caporiacco, 1949 — Kenya
 Scotophaeus afghanicus Roewer, 1961 — Afghanistan
 Scotophaeus arboricola Jézéquel, 1965 — Ivory Coast
 Scotophaeus bersebaensis Strand, 1915 — Namibia
 Scotophaeus bharatae Gajbe, 1989 — India
 Scotophaeus bifidus Schmidt & Krause, 1994 — Cape Verde Is.
 Scotophaeus blackwalli (Thorell, 1871) — Europe, Caucasus. Introduced to North America, Peru, Hawaii
 Scotophaeus blackwalli isabellinus (Simon, 1873) — France (Corsica), Italy, Croatia
 Scotophaeus blackwalli politus (Simon, 1878) — France
 Scotophaeus brolemanni Simon, 1914 — France
 Scotophaeus cecileae Barrion & Litsinger, 1995 — Philippines
 Scotophaeus correntinus Mello-Leitão, 1945 — Argentina
 Scotophaeus crinitus Jézéquel, 1965 — Ivory Coast
 Scotophaeus dispulsus (O. Pickard-Cambridge, 1885) — Tajikistan, Mongolia
 Scotophaeus dolanskyi Lissner, 2017 — Portugal
 Scotophaeus domesticus Tikader, 1962 — India
 Scotophaeus fabrisae Caporiacco, 1950 — Italy
 Scotophaeus faisalabadiensis Ghafoor & Beg, 2002 — Pakistan
 Scotophaeus gridellii Caporiacco, 1928 — Canary Is.
 Scotophaeus hierro Schmidt, 1977 — Canary Is.
 Scotophaeus hunan Zhang, Song & Zhu, 2003 — China, Japan
 Scotophaeus insularis Berland, 1936 — Cape Verde Is., Greece
 Scotophaeus invisus (O. Pickard-Cambridge, 1885) — China (Yarkand)
 Scotophaeus jacksoni Berland, 1936 — Cape Verde Is.
 Scotophaeus jinlin Song, Zhu & Zhang, 2004 — China
 Scotophaeus kalimpongensis Gajbe, 1992 — India
 Scotophaeus lamperti Strand, 1906 — Central Africa
 Scotophaeus lindbergi Roewer, 1961 — Afghanistan
 Scotophaeus madalasae Tikader & Gajbe, 1977 — India
 Scotophaeus marleyi Tucker, 1923 — South Africa
 Scotophaeus mauckneri Schmidt, 1956 — Canary Is.
 Scotophaeus merkaricola Strand, 1907 — India
 Scotophaeus meruensis Tullgren, 1910 — East Africa
 Scotophaeus microdon Caporiacco, 1933 — Libya
 Scotophaeus musculus (Simon, 1878) — Salvages, Madeira, France
 Scotophaeus nanoides Wunderlich, 2011 — Portugal
 Scotophaeus nanus Wunderlich, 1995 — Austria
 Scotophaeus natalensis Lawrence, 1938 — South Africa
 Scotophaeus nigrosegmentatus (Simon, 1895) — Mongolia, Karakorum
 Scotophaeus nossibeensis Strand, 1907 — Madagascar
 Scotophaeus nyrensis Simon, 1909 — East Africa
 Scotophaeus parvioculis Strand, 1906 — Ethiopia
 Scotophaeus peninsularis Roewer, 1928 — Greece (incl. Crete), Israel
 Scotophaeus poonaensis Tikader, 1982 — India
 Scotophaeus pretiosus (L. Koch, 1873) — New Zealand
 Scotophaeus purcelli Tucker, 1923 — South Africa
 Scotophaeus quadripunctatus (Linnaeus, 1758) (type) — Europe, Turkey, Caucasus
 Scotophaeus rajasthanus Tikader, 1966 — India
 Scotophaeus rebellatus (Simon, 1880) — China
 Scotophaeus regularis Tullgren, 1910 — East Africa
 Scotophaeus relegatus Purcell, 1907 — Namibia, South Africa
 Scotophaeus retusus (Simon, 1878) — France
 Scotophaeus rufescens (Kroneberg, 1875) — Central Asia
 Scotophaeus schenkeli Caporiacco, 1949 — Kenya
 Scotophaeus scutulatus (L. Koch, 1866) — Europe, Algeria, Turkey, Caucasus, Russia (Europe to south Siberia), Central Asia
 Scotophaeus semitectus (Simon, 1886) — Senegal
 Scotophaeus simlaensis Tikader, 1982 — India, China
 Scotophaeus strandi Caporiacco, 1940 — Ethiopia
 Scotophaeus tubicola Schmidt, 1990 — Canary Is.
 Scotophaeus typhlus Schmidt & Piepho, 1994 — Cape Verde Is.
 Scotophaeus validus (Lucas, 1846) — Southern Europe, Morocco, Algeria
 Scotophaeus westringi Simon, 1914 — France
 Scotophaeus xizang Zhang, Song & Zhu, 2003 — China

Sergiolus

Sergiolus Simon, 1892
 Sergiolus angustus (Banks, 1904) — North America
 Sergiolus bicolor Banks, 1900 — USA, Canada
 Sergiolus capulatus (Walckenaer, 1837) (type) — USA, Canada
 Sergiolus columbianus (Emerton, 1917) — USA, Canada
 Sergiolus cyaneiventris Simon, 1893 — USA, Cuba
 Sergiolus decoratus Kaston, 1945 — USA, Canada
 Sergiolus gertschi Platnick & Shadab, 1981 — USA, Mexico
 Sergiolus guadalupensis Platnick & Shadab, 1981 — Mexico
 Sergiolus hosiziro (Yaginuma, 1960) — China, Korea, Japan
 Sergiolus iviei Platnick & Shadab, 1981 — USA, Canada
 Sergiolus kastoni Platnick & Shadab, 1981 — USA, Cuba
 Sergiolus khodiarae Patel, 1988 — India
 Sergiolus lamhetaghatensis Gajbe & Gajbe, 1999 — India
 Sergiolus lowelli Chamberlin & Woodbury, 1929 — USA, Mexico
 Sergiolus magnus (Bryant, 1948) — Hispaniola
 Sergiolus mainlingensis Hu, 2001 — China
 Sergiolus meghalayensis Tikader & Gajbe, 1976 — India
 Sergiolus minutus (Banks, 1898) — USA, Cuba, Jamaica
 Sergiolus montanus (Emerton, 1890) — North America
 Sergiolus ocellatus (Walckenaer, 1837) — USA, Canada
 Sergiolus poonaensis Tikader & Gajbe, 1976 — India
 Sergiolus singhi Tikader & Gajbe, 1976 — India
 Sergiolus songi Xu, 1991 — China
 Sergiolus stella Chamberlin, 1922 — USA, Mexico
 Sergiolus tennesseensis Chamberlin, 1922 — USA
 Sergiolus unimaculatus Emerton, 1915 — USA, Canada

Sernokorba

Sernokorba Kamura, 1992
 Sernokorba fanjing Song, Zhu & Zhang, 2004 — China
 Sernokorba pallidipatellis (Bösenberg & Strand, 1906) (type) — Russia (Far East), China, Korea, Japan
 Sernokorba tescorum (Simon, 1914) — France, Spain

Setaphis

Setaphis Simon, 1893
 Setaphis algerica (Dalmas, 1922) — Spain, Algeria
 Setaphis atlantica (Berland, 1936) — Cape Verde Is.
 Setaphis browni (Tucker, 1923) — Central, South Africa to Pakistan, India
 Setaphis canariensis (Simon, 1883) — Canary Is., Madeira
 Setaphis carmeli (O. Pickard-Cambridge, 1872) — Canary Is., Mediterranean
 Setaphis fuscipes (Simon, 1885) — Morocco to Israel
 Setaphis gomerae (Schmidt, 1981) — Canary Is.
 Setaphis jocquei Platnick & Murphy, 1996 — Ivory Coast
 Setaphis makalali FitzPatrick, 2005 — South Africa
 Setaphis mediterranea Levy, 2009 — Israel
 Setaphis mollis (O. Pickard-Cambridge, 1874) — North Africa, Israel
 Setaphis murphyi Wunderlich, 2011 — Canary Is.
 Setaphis parvula (Lucas, 1846) (type) — Mediterranean
 Setaphis salrei Schmidt, 1999 — Cape Verde Is.
 Setaphis sexmaculata Simon, 1893 — South Africa
 Setaphis simplex (Simon, 1885) — Tunisia
 Setaphis spiribulbis (Denis, 1952) — Morocco
 Setaphis subtilis (Simon, 1897) — West, South Africa to Philippines
 Setaphis villiersi (Denis, 1955) — Niger, Somalia, Ethiopia
 Setaphis walteri Platnick & Murphy, 1996 — Canary Is.
 Setaphis wunderlichi Platnick & Murphy, 1996 — Canary Is.

Shaitan

Shaitan Kovblyuk, Kastrygina & Marusik, 2013
 Shaitan elchini Kovblyuk, Kastrygina & Marusik, 2013 (type) — Russia (Europe), Azerbaijan, Kazakhstan

Shiragaia

Shiragaia Paik, 1992
 Shiragaia taeguensis Paik, 1992 (type) — Korea

Sidydrassus

Sidydrassus Esyunin & Tuneva, 2002
 Sidydrassus rogue Tuneva, 2004 — Kazakhstan
 Sidydrassus shumakovi (Spassky, 1934) (type) — Russia (Europe), Azerbaijan, Iran, Kazakhstan
 Sidydrassus tianschanicus (Hu & Wu, 1989) — China

Smionia

Smionia Dalmas, 1920
 Smionia capensis Dalmas, 1920 (type) — South Africa
 Smionia lineatipes (Purcell, 1908) — Botswana, South Africa

Sosticus

Sosticus Chamberlin, 1922
 Sosticus californicus Platnick & Shadab, 1976 — USA
 Sosticus dherikanalensis Gajbe, 1979 — India
 Sosticus insularis (Banks, 1895) (type) — USA, Canada
 Sosticus jabalpurensis Bhandari & Gajbe, 2001 — India
 Sosticus loricatus (L. Koch, 1866) — Europe, Caucasus, Russia (Europe to Far East), Iran, Central Asia, China. Introduced to North America
 Sosticus nainitalensis Gajbe, 1979 — India
 Sosticus pawani Gajbe, 1993 — India
 Sosticus poonaensis Tikader, 1982 — India
 Sosticus solanensis Gajbe, 1979 — India
 Sosticus sundargarhensis Gajbe, 1979 — India

Symphanodes

Symphanodes Rainbow, 1916
 Symphanodes dianiphus Rainbow, 1916 (type) — Australia (Queensland)

Synaphosus

Synaphosus Platnick & Shadab, 1980
 Synaphosus cangshanus Yang, Yang & Zhang, 2013 — China
 Synaphosus daweiensis Yin, Bao & Peng, 2002 — China
 Synaphosus dubius Marusik & Omelko, 2018 — Thailand
 Synaphosus evertsi Ovtsharenko, Levy & Platnick, 1994 — Ivory Coast, Indonesia (Bali), Philippines
 Synaphosus femininis Deeleman-Reinhold, 2001 — China, Laos, Indonesia (Java)
 Synaphosus gracillimus (O. Pickard-Cambridge, 1872) — Egypt, Israel
 Synaphosus intricatus (Denis, 1947) — Algeria, Egypt
 Synaphosus iunctus Sankaran & Sebastian, 2018 — India
 Synaphosus jaegeri Marusik & Omelko, 2018 — Laos
 Synaphosus kakamega Ovtsharenko, Levy & Platnick, 1994 — Kenya
 Synaphosus karakumensis Ovtsharenko, Levy & Platnick, 1994 — Turkmenistan
 Synaphosus khashm Ovtsharenko, Levy & Platnick, 1994 — Saudi Arabia
 Synaphosus lehtineni Marusik & Omelko, 2018 — Indonesia (Sulawesi)
 Synaphosus makhambetensis Ponomarev, 2008 — Kazakhstan
 Synaphosus minimus (Caporiacco, 1936) — Libya, Egypt
 Synaphosus mongolicus Marusik & Fomichev, 2016 — Mongolia
 Synaphosus nanus (O. Pickard-Cambridge, 1872) — Israel
 Synaphosus neali Ovtsharenko, Levy & Platnick, 1994 — Iran, Pakistan
 Synaphosus ovtsharenkoi Marusik & Fomichev, 2016 — Mongolia
 Synaphosus palearcticus Ovtsharenko, Levy & Platnick, 1994 — Greece, Turkey to Central Asia
 Synaphosus paludis (Chamberlin & Gertsch, 1940) — USA
 Synaphosus raveni Deeleman-Reinhold, 2001 — Thailand
 Synaphosus saidovi Marusik & Fomichev, 2016 — Tajikistan
 Synaphosus sauvage Ovtsharenko, Levy & Platnick, 1994 — Spain, France, Switzerland, Italy
 Synaphosus shirin Ovtsharenko, Levy & Platnick, 1994 — Cyprus, Iran
 Synaphosus shmakovi Marusik & Fomichev, 2016 — Mongolia
 Synaphosus soyunovi Ovtsharenko, Levy & Platnick, 1994 — Turkmenistan
 Synaphosus syntheticus (Chamberlin, 1924) (type) — Libya, Egypt, Israel, Saudi Arabia. Introduced to USA, Mexico
 Synaphosus taukum Ovtsharenko, Levy & Platnick, 1994 — Kazakhstan
 Synaphosus trichopus (Roewer, 1928) — Greece, Crete
 Synaphosus turanicus Ovtsharenko, Levy & Platnick, 1994 — Central Asia
 Synaphosus yatenga Ovtsharenko, Levy & Platnick, 1994 — Burkina Faso

T

Talanites

Talanites Simon, 1893
 Talanites atscharicus Mcheidze, 1946 — Georgia, Kazakhstan
 Talanites captiosus (Gertsch & Davis, 1936) — USA, Mexico
 Talanites cavernicola Thorell, 1897 — Myanmar
 Talanites dunini Platnick & Ovtsharenko, 1991 — Israel, Central Asia
 Talanites echinus (Chamberlin, 1922) — USA
 Talanites exlineae (Platnick & Shadab, 1976) — USA
 Talanites fagei Spassky, 1938 — Azerbaijan, Russia (Europe) to Central Asia
 Talanites fervidus Simon, 1893 (type) — Egypt, Israel
 Talanites mikhailovi Platnick & Ovtsharenko, 1991 — Kazakhstan
 Talanites moodyae Platnick & Ovtsharenko, 1991 — USA
 Talanites ornatus (O. Pickard-Cambridge, 1874) — Egypt
 Talanites santschii Dalmas, 1918 — Tunisia
 Talanites strandi Spassky, 1940 — Ukraine, Russia (Europe), Kazakhstan
 Talanites tibialis Caporiacco, 1934 — India, Pakistan
 Talanites ubicki Platnick & Ovtsharenko, 1991 — USA

Talanitoides

Talanitoides Levy, 2009
 Talanitoides habesor Levy, 2009 (type) — Israel

Theuma

Theuma Simon, 1893
 Theuma ababensis Tucker, 1923 — South Africa
 Theuma andonea Lawrence, 1927 — Namibia
 Theuma aprica Simon, 1893 — South Africa
 Theuma capensis Purcell, 1907 — Botswana, South Africa
 Theuma cedri Purcell, 1907 — South Africa
 Theuma elucubata Tucker, 1923 — South Africa
 Theuma foveolata Tucker, 1923 — South Africa
 Theuma funerea Lawrence, 1928 — Namibia
 Theuma fusca Purcell, 1907 — Namibia, South Africa
 Theuma intermedia Strand, 1915 — Namibia
 Theuma longipes Lawrence, 1927 — Namibia
 Theuma maculata Purcell, 1907 — South Africa
 Theuma microphthalma Lawrence, 1928 — Namibia
 Theuma mutica Purcell, 1907 — South Africa
 Theuma ovambica Lawrence, 1927 — Namibia
 Theuma parva Purcell, 1907 — South Africa
 Theuma purcelli Tucker, 1923 — South Africa
 Theuma pusilla Purcell, 1908 — Namibia, South Africa
 Theuma recta Lawrence, 1927 — Namibia
 Theuma schreineri Purcell, 1907 — South Africa
 Theuma schultzei Purcell, 1908 — Namibia, South Africa
 Theuma tragardhi Lawrence, 1947 — South Africa
 Theuma velox Purcell, 1908 — Namibia
 Theuma walteri (Simon, 1889) (type) — Turkmenistan?
 Theuma xylina Simon, 1893 — South Africa
 Theuma zuluensis Lawrence, 1947 — South Africa

Theumella

Theumella Strand, 1906
 Theumella penicillata Strand, 1906 — Ethiopia
 Theumella typica Strand, 1906 (type) — Ethiopia

Titus

Titus O. Pickard-Cambridge, 1901
 Titus lugens O. Pickard-Cambridge, 1901 (type) — Zimbabwe

Tivodrassus

Tivodrassus Chamberlin & Ivie, 1936
 Tivodrassus ethophor Chamberlin & Ivie, 1936 (type) — Mexico
 Tivodrassus farias Platnick & Shadab, 1976 — Mexico
 Tivodrassus pecki Platnick & Shadab, 1976 — Mexico
 Tivodrassus reddelli Platnick & Shadab, 1976 — Mexico

Trachyzelotes

Trachyzelotes Lohmander, 1944
 Trachyzelotes adriaticus (Caporiacco, 1951) — Italy to China
 Trachyzelotes ansimensis Seo, 2002 — Korea
 Trachyzelotes baiyuensis Xu, 1991 — China
 Trachyzelotes barbatus (L. Koch, 1866) — Mediterranean to Caucasus. Introduced to USA
 Trachyzelotes bardiae (Caporiacco, 1928) — Mediterranean
 Trachyzelotes chybyndensis Tuneva & Esyunin, 2002 — Russia (Europe), Kazakhstan
 Trachyzelotes cumensis (Ponomarev, 1979) — Ukraine, Russia (Europe), Azerbaijan, Kazakhstan
 Trachyzelotes fuscipes (L. Koch, 1866) — Mediterranean, Kazakhstan, China
 Trachyzelotes glossus (Strand, 1915) — Turkey, Israel
 Trachyzelotes holosericeus (Simon, 1878) — Mediterranean
 Trachyzelotes huberti Platnick & Murphy, 1984 — Algeria, Italy, Albania
 Trachyzelotes jaxartensis (Kroneberg, 1875) — Northern Africa to Caucasus, Russia (Europe) to Central Asia, Iran. Introduced to Hawaii, USA, Mexico, South Africa, India, China
 Trachyzelotes kulczynskii (Bösenberg, 1902) — Macedonia, Bulgaria. Introduced to USA, Caribbean, Colombia, Brazil, Japan, Samoa
 Trachyzelotes lyonneti (Audouin, 1826) — Macaronesia, Mediterranean to Central Asia. Introduced to USA, Mexico, Peru, Brazil
 Trachyzelotes malkini Platnick & Murphy, 1984 — Romania, Albania, Macedonia, Bulgaria, Greece, Ukraine, Russia (Europe, Caucasus), Turkey, Iran, Kazakhstan
 Trachyzelotes manytchensis Ponomarev & Tsvetkov, 2006 — Russia (Europe), Iran
 Trachyzelotes miniglossus Levy, 2009 — Israel, Iran
 Trachyzelotes minutus Crespo, 2010 — Portugal
 Trachyzelotes mutabilis (Simon, 1878) — Mediterranean, Romania
 Trachyzelotes pedestris (C. L. Koch, 1837) (type) — Europe, Caucasus, Turkey, Iran
 Trachyzelotes ravidus (L. Koch, 1875) — Ethiopia
 Trachyzelotes stubbsi Platnick & Murphy, 1984 — Greece, Cyprus

Trephopoda

Trephopoda Tucker, 1923
 Trephopoda aplanita (Tucker, 1923) — South Africa
 Trephopoda biamenta (Tucker, 1923) — South Africa
 Trephopoda ctenipalpis (Lawrence, 1927) — Namibia
 Trephopoda hanoveria Tucker, 1923 (type) — South Africa
 Trephopoda kannemeyeri (Tucker, 1923) — South Africa
 Trephopoda parvipalpa (Tucker, 1923) — South Africa

Trichothyse

Trichothyse Tucker, 1923
 Trichothyse africana (Tucker, 1923) — South Africa
 Trichothyse fontensis Lawrence, 1928 — Namibia
 Trichothyse hortensis Tucker, 1923 (type) — South Africa
 Trichothyse subtropica Lawrence, 1927 — Namibia

Tricongius

Tricongius Simon, 1893
 Tricongius amazonicus Platnick & Höfer, 1990 — Brazil
 Tricongius collinus Simon, 1893 (type) — Venezuela
 Tricongius granadensis Mello-Leitão, 1941 — Colombia

Turkozelotes

Turkozelotes Kovblyuk & Seyyar, 2009
 Turkozelotes mccowani (Chatzaki & Russell-Smith, 2017) — Greece, Cyprus
 Turkozelotes microb Kovblyuk & Seyyar, 2009 (type) — Greece, Turkey
 Turkozelotes mirandus Ponomarev, 2011 — Russia (Europe), Iran

U

Urozelotes

Urozelotes Mello-Leitão, 1938
 Urozelotes kabenge FitzPatrick, 2005 — Zambia
 Urozelotes mysticus Platnick & Murphy, 1984 — Italy
 Urozelotes patulusus Sankaran & Sebastian, 2018 — India
 Urozelotes rusticus (L. Koch, 1872) (type) — Both Americas, Africa, Europe, Asia, Australia. Native area unknown, probably Old World.
 Urozelotes trifidus Tuneva, 2003 — France, Russia (Europe)

V

Verita

Verita Ramírez & Grismado, 2016
 Verita williamsi Ramírez & Grismado, 2016 (type) — Argentina

W

Wesmaldra

Wesmaldra Platnick & Baehr, 2006
 Wesmaldra baynesi Platnick & Baehr, 2006 — Australia (Western Australia)
 Wesmaldra bidgemia Platnick & Baehr, 2006 (type) — Australia (Western Australia)
 Wesmaldra bromilowi Platnick & Baehr, 2006 — Australia (Western Australia)
 Wesmaldra hirsti Platnick & Baehr, 2006 — Australia (Western Australia)
 Wesmaldra kakadu Platnick & Baehr, 2006 — Australia (Northern Territory)
 Wesmaldra learmonth Platnick & Baehr, 2006 — Australia (Western Australia)
 Wesmaldra napier Platnick & Baehr, 2006 — Australia (Western Australia)
 Wesmaldra nixaut Platnick & Baehr, 2006 — Australia (Western Australia)
 Wesmaldra rolfei Platnick & Baehr, 2006 — Australia (Western Australia)
 Wesmaldra splendida (Simon, 1908) — Australia (Western Australia)
 Wesmaldra talgomine Platnick & Baehr, 2006 — Australia (Western Australia)
 Wesmaldra urawa Platnick & Baehr, 2006 — Australia (Western Australia)
 Wesmaldra waldockae Platnick & Baehr, 2006 — Australia (Western Australia)
 Wesmaldra wiluna Platnick & Baehr, 2006 — Australia (Western Australia)

Wydundra

Wydundra Platnick & Baehr, 2006
 Wydundra alexandria Platnick & Baehr, 2013 — Australia (Northern Territory)
 Wydundra anjo Platnick & Baehr, 2006 — Australia (Western Australia)
 Wydundra barrow Platnick & Baehr, 2006 — Australia (Western Australia, Northern Territory)
 Wydundra camooweal Platnick & Baehr, 2013 — Australia (Queensland)
 Wydundra carinda Platnick & Baehr, 2006 — Australia (South Australia, New South Wales)
 Wydundra charnley Platnick & Baehr, 2006 — Australia (Western Australia)
 Wydundra chillagoe Platnick & Baehr, 2013 — Australia (Queensland)
 Wydundra churchillae Platnick & Baehr, 2006 — Australia (Northern Territory)
 Wydundra clifton Platnick & Baehr, 2006 — Australia (South Australia)
 Wydundra cooper Platnick & Baehr, 2006 — Australia (South Australia, New South Wales)
 Wydundra cunderdin Platnick & Baehr, 2006 — Australia (Western Australia)
 Wydundra daunton Platnick & Baehr, 2006 — Australia (Queensland)
 Wydundra drysdale Platnick & Baehr, 2006 — Australia (Western Australia)
 Wydundra ethabuka Platnick & Baehr, 2006 — Australia (Northern Territory, Queensland)
 Wydundra fitzroy Platnick & Baehr, 2006 — Australia (Queensland)
 Wydundra flattery Platnick & Baehr, 2006 — Australia (Queensland)
 Wydundra garnet Platnick & Baehr, 2006 — Australia (Queensland)
 Wydundra gibb Platnick & Baehr, 2006 — Australia (Western Australia, Northern Territory)
 Wydundra gilliat Platnick & Baehr, 2013 — Australia (Queensland)
 Wydundra gully Platnick & Baehr, 2006 — Australia (Queensland)
 Wydundra gunbiyarrmi Platnick & Baehr, 2006 — Australia (Northern Territory)
 Wydundra humbert Platnick & Baehr, 2006 — Australia (Northern Territory)
 Wydundra humptydoo Platnick & Baehr, 2006 — Australia (Northern Territory)
 Wydundra jabiru Platnick & Baehr, 2006 — Australia (Northern Territory)
 Wydundra kalamurina Platnick & Baehr, 2006 — Australia (South Australia)
 Wydundra kennedy Platnick & Baehr, 2006 — Australia (Western Australia)
 Wydundra kohi Platnick & Baehr, 2006 — Australia (Queensland)
 Wydundra leichhardti Platnick & Baehr, 2013 — Australia (Queensland)
 Wydundra lennard Platnick & Baehr, 2006 — Australia (Western Australia)
 Wydundra lindsay Platnick & Baehr, 2006 — Australia (South Australia)
 Wydundra lowrie Platnick & Baehr, 2006 — Australia (Queensland)
 Wydundra moolooloo Platnick & Baehr, 2006 — Australia (South Australia)
 Wydundra moondarra Platnick & Baehr, 2006 — Australia (Queensland)
 Wydundra morton Platnick & Baehr, 2006 — Australia (New South Wales)
 Wydundra neinaut Platnick & Baehr, 2006 — Australia (Queensland)
 Wydundra newcastle Platnick & Baehr, 2006 — Australia (Queensland)
 Wydundra normanton Platnick & Baehr, 2006 — Australia (Queensland)
 Wydundra octomile Platnick & Baehr, 2006 — Australia (Queensland)
 Wydundra osbourne Platnick & Baehr, 2006 (type) — Australia (Queensland)
 Wydundra percy Platnick & Baehr, 2006 — Australia (Queensland)
 Wydundra solo Platnick & Baehr, 2006 — Australia (Western Australia)
 Wydundra uluru Platnick & Baehr, 2006 — Australia (Western Australia, Northern Territory)
 Wydundra undara Platnick & Baehr, 2006 — Australia (Queensland)
 Wydundra voc (Deeleman-Reinhold, 2001) — Malaysia, Indonesia Moluccas)
 Wydundra webberae Platnick & Baehr, 2006 — Australia (Northern Territory)
 Wydundra windsor Platnick & Baehr, 2006 — Australia (Queensland)

X

Xerophaeus

Xerophaeus Purcell, 1907
 Xerophaeus ahenus Purcell, 1908 — South Africa
 Xerophaeus anthropoides Hewitt, 1916 — South Africa
 Xerophaeus appendiculatus Purcell, 1907 — South Africa
 Xerophaeus aridus Purcell, 1907 — Namibia, South Africa
 Xerophaeus aurariarum Purcell, 1907 — South Africa
 Xerophaeus bicavus Tucker, 1923 — South Africa
 Xerophaeus biplagiatus Tullgren, 1910 — East AFrica
 Xerophaeus capensis Purcell, 1907 (type) — South Africa
 Xerophaeus communis Purcell, 1907 — South Africa
 Xerophaeus coruscus (L. Koch, 1875) — Ethiopia, East Africa, Yemen
 Xerophaeus coruscus kibonotensis Tullgren, 1910 — East, South Africa
 Xerophaeus crusculus Tucker, 1923 — South Africa
 Xerophaeus crustosus Purcell, 1907 — South Africa
 Xerophaeus druryi Tucker, 1923 — South Africa
 Xerophaeus espoir Platnick, 1981 — Seychelles
 Xerophaeus exiguus Purcell, 1907 — South Africa
 Xerophaeus flammeus Tucker, 1923 — South Africa
 Xerophaeus flavescens Purcell, 1907 — South Africa
 Xerophaeus hottentottus Purcell, 1908 — South Africa
 Xerophaeus kiwuensis Strand, 1913 — Central Africa
 Xerophaeus lightfooti Purcell, 1907 — South Africa
 Xerophaeus longispina Purcell, 1908 — South Africa
 Xerophaeus lunulifer Purcell, 1907 — South Africa
 Xerophaeus maritimus Lawrence, 1938 — South Africa
 Xerophaeus matroosbergensis Tucker, 1923 — South Africa
 Xerophaeus occiduus Tucker, 1923 — South Africa
 Xerophaeus oceanicus Schmidt & Jocqué, 1983 — Réunion
 Xerophaeus pallidus Tucker, 1923 — South Africa
 Xerophaeus patricki Purcell, 1907 — South Africa
 Xerophaeus perversus Purcell, 1923 — South Africa
 Xerophaeus phaseolus Tucker, 1923 — South Africa
 Xerophaeus robustus Lawrence, 1936 — South Africa
 Xerophaeus rostratus Purcell, 1907 — South Africa
 Xerophaeus ruandanus Strand, 1913 — Rwanda
 Xerophaeus rubeus Tucker, 1923 — South Africa
 Xerophaeus silvaticus Tucker, 1923 — South Africa
 Xerophaeus spiralifer Purcell, 1907 — South Africa
 Xerophaeus spoliator Purcell, 1907 — South Africa
 Xerophaeus tenebrosus Tucker, 1923 — South Africa
 Xerophaeus thomasi (Caporiacco, 1949) — Kenya
 Xerophaeus vickermani Tucker, 1923 — South Africa
 Xerophaeus zuluensis Lawrence, 1938 — South Africa

Xizangia

Xizangia Song, Zhu & Zhang, 2004
 Xizangia linzhiensis (Hu, 2001) (type) — China
 Xizangia rigaze Song, Zhu & Zhang, 2004 — China

Z

Zelanda

Zelanda Özdikmen, 2009
 Zelanda elongata (Forster, 1979) — New Zealand
 Zelanda erebus (L. Koch, 1873) (type) — New Zealand
 Zelanda kaituna (Forster, 1979) — New Zealand
 Zelanda miranda (Forster, 1979) — New Zealand
 Zelanda obtusa (Forster, 1979) — New Zealand
 Zelanda titirangia (Ovtsharenko, Fedoryak & Zakharov, 2006) — New Zealand

Zelominor

Zelominor Snazell & Murphy, 1997
 Zelominor algarvensis Snazell & Murphy, 1997 — Portugal, Spain
 Zelominor algericus Snazell & Murphy, 1997 — Algeria
 Zelominor malagensis Snazell & Murphy, 1997 (type) — Spain

Zelotes

Zelotes Gistel, 1848
 Zelotes abdurakhmanovi Ponomarev, 2018 — Kazakhstan
 Zelotes acapulcoanus Gertsch & Davis, 1940 — Mexico
 Zelotes acarnanicus Lissner & Chatzaki, 2018 — Greece
 Zelotes adderet Levy, 2009 — Israel
 Zelotes aeneus (Simon, 1878) — Madeira, Europe, Azerbaijan
 Zelotes aerosus Charitonov, 1946 — Greece (Crete), Central Asia
 Zelotes aestus (Tucker, 1923) — Namibia
 Zelotes aiken Platnick & Shadab, 1983 — USA
 Zelotes albanicus (Hewitt, 1915) — South Africa
 Zelotes albomaculatus (O. Pickard-Cambridge, 1901) — South Africa
 Zelotes alpujarraensis Senglet, 2011 — Spain
 Zelotes altissimus Hu, 1989 — China
 Zelotes anchoralis Denis, 1958 — Afghanistan
 Zelotes andreinii Reimoser, 1937 — Ethiopia, Uganda
 Zelotes anglo Gertsch & Riechert, 1976 — USA, Mexico
 Zelotes angolensis FitzPatrick, 2007 — Angola
 Zelotes annamarieae Lissner, 2017 — Canary Is.
 Zelotes anthereus Chamberlin, 1936 — USA
 Zelotes apricorum (L. Koch, 1876) — Europe, Turkey, Kazakhstan
 Zelotes argoliensis (C. L. Koch, 1839) — Greece
 Zelotes aridus (Purcell, 1907) — Tanzania, Namibia, South Africa
 Zelotes arnoldii Charitonov, 1946 — Central Asia
 Zelotes ashae Tikader & Gajbe, 1976 — India
 Zelotes asiaticus (Bösenberg & Strand, 1906) — Russia (Far East), China, Korea, Japan
 Zelotes atlanticus (Simon, 1909) — Morocco
 Zelotes atrocaeruleus (Simon, 1878) — Europe, Turkey, Caucasus, Russia (Europe) to Central Asia, China
 Zelotes aurantiacus Miller, 1967 — Central to eastern Europe, Turkey
 Zelotes azsheganovae Esyunin & Efimik, 1992 — Ukraine, Russia (Europe to south Siberia), Kazakhstan
 Zelotes babunaensis (Drensky, 1929) — Greece
 Zelotes baeticus Senglet, 2011 — Spain
 Zelotes bajo Platnick & Shadab, 1983 — Mexico
 Zelotes balcanicus Deltshev, 2006 — Italy, Bulgaria, Romania, Greece, Macedonia, Israel
 Zelotes baltistanus Caporiacco, 1934 — Pakistan, Russia (south and northeastern Siberia), Mongolia
 Zelotes baltoroi Caporiacco, 1934 — India, Karakorum
 Zelotes bambari FitzPatrick, 2007 — Central African Rep.
 Zelotes banana FitzPatrick, 2007 — Congo
 Zelotes barbarus (Simon, 1885) — Morocco, Algeria, Tunisia
 Zelotes barkol Platnick & Song, 1986 — Russia (south Siberia), China
 Zelotes bashaneus Levy, 1998 — Israel
 Zelotes bassari FitzPatrick, 2007 — Togo
 Zelotes bastardi (Simon, 1896) — Zimbabwe, South Africa, Madagascar
 Zelotes beijianensis Hu & Wu, 1989 — China
 Zelotes berytensis (Simon, 1884) — Syria
 Zelotes bharatae Gajbe, 2005 — India
 Zelotes bicolor Hu & Wu, 1989 — China
 Zelotes bifukaensis Kamura, 2000 — Japan
 Zelotes bifurcutis Zhang, Zhu & Tso, 2009 — Taiwan
 Zelotes bimaculatus (C. L. Koch, 1837) — Hungary, Greece, Russia (Europe)
 Zelotes birmanicus (Simon, 1884) — Myanmar
 Zelotes bokerensis Levy, 1998 — Israel
 Zelotes boluensis Wunderlich, 2011 — Turkey
 Zelotes bozbalus Roewer, 1961 — Afghanistan
 Zelotes brennanorum FitzPatrick, 2007 — Malawi, Zimbabwe
 Zelotes broomi (Purcell, 1907) — South Africa
 Zelotes butarensis FitzPatrick, 2007 — West, Central Africa
 Zelotes butembo FitzPatrick, 2007 — Congo
 Zelotes calactinus Di Franco, 1989 — Italy
 Zelotes caldarius (Purcell, 1907) — South Africa
 Zelotes callidus (Simon, 1878) — Spain (mainland, Menorca), France, Italy, Morocco
 Zelotes cantonensis Platnick & Song, 1986 — China
 Zelotes capensis FitzPatrick, 2007 — South Africa
 Zelotes capiliae Barrion & Litsinger, 1995 — Philippines
 Zelotes caprearum (Pavesi, 1875) — Italy
 Zelotes caprivi FitzPatrick, 2007 — Namibia
 Zelotes capsula Tucker, 1923 — South Africa
 Zelotes caracasanus (Simon, 1893) — Venezuela
 Zelotes caspius Ponomarev & Tsvetkov, 2006 — Kazakhstan
 Zelotes cassinensis FitzPatrick, 2007 — Guinea-Bissau
 Zelotes catholicus Chamberlin, 1924 — Mexico
 Zelotes cayucos Platnick & Shadab, 1983 — USA
 Zelotes chandosiensis Tikader & Gajbe, 1976 — India
 Zelotes chaniaensis Senglet, 2011 — Greece (Crete), Iran?
 Zelotes chinguli FitzPatrick, 2007 — Botswana, Zimbabwe
 Zelotes chotorus Roewer, 1961 — Afghanistan
 Zelotes choubeyi Tikader & Gajbe, 1979 — India
 Zelotes cingarus (O. Pickard-Cambridge, 1874) — Macedonia, Bulgaria, Greece, Turkey, Tajikistan
 Zelotes clivicola (L. Koch, 1870) — Europe, Turkey, Russia (Europe to south Siberia), Kazakhstan
 Zelotes coeruleus (Holmberg, 1876) — Argentina
 Zelotes comparilis (Simon, 1886) — Senegal, Burkina Faso
 Zelotes cordiger (L. Koch, 1875) — Ethiopia
 Zelotes cordubensis Senglet, 2011 — Spain
 Zelotes cornipalpus Melic, Silva & Barrientos, 2016 — Portugal, Spain
 Zelotes corrugatus (Purcell, 1907) — Southern Africa
 Zelotes creticus (Kulczyński, 1903) — Greece (Crete)
 Zelotes criniger Denis, 1937 — Mediterranean
 Zelotes cruz Platnick & Shadab, 1983 — USA
 Zelotes cyanescens Simon, 1914 — France
 Zelotes daidalus Chatzaki, 2003 — Greece (Crete)
 Zelotes davidi (Simon, 1884) — Libya, Syria
 Zelotes davidi Schenkel, 1963 — China, Korea, Japan
 Zelotes denapes Platnick, 1993 — Italy
 Zelotes desioi Caporiacco, 1934 — India
 Zelotes devotus Grimm, 1982 — Alps (France, Switzerland, Austria, Italy)
 Zelotes discens Chamberlin, 1922 — USA
 Zelotes distinctissimus Caporiacco, 1929 — Greece
 Zelotes doddieburni FitzPatrick, 2007 — Zimbabwe, South Africa
 Zelotes donan Kamura, 1999 — Japan (Ryukyu Is.)
 Zelotes donnanae FitzPatrick, 2007 — Congo
 Zelotes duplex Chamberlin, 1922 — USA, Canada
 Zelotes egregioides Senglet, 2011 — Portugal, Spain, France
 Zelotes egregius Simon, 1914 — Spain (Balearic Is.), Andorra, France, Italy
 Zelotes electus (C. L. Koch, 1839) — Europe, Turkey, Caucasus, Russia (Europe to south Siberia), Central Asia
 Zelotes erebeus (Thorell, 1871) — Europe, Turkey
 Zelotes eremus Levy, 1998 — Israel
 Zelotes ernsti (Simon, 1893) — Venezuela
 Zelotes erythrocephalus (Lucas, 1846) — Algeria
 Zelotes eskovi Zhang & Song, 2001 — China
 Zelotes eugenei Kovblyuk, 2009 — Greece, Ukraine, Russia (Europe, Caucasus)
 Zelotes exiguoides Platnick & Shadab, 1983 — USA, Canada
 Zelotes exiguus (Müller & Schenkel, 1895) — Europe, Turkey, Russia (Europe to Far East), China, Korea, Japan
 Zelotes fagei Denis, 1955 — Niger, Egypt
 Zelotes faisalabadensis Butt & Beg, 2004 — Pakistan
 Zelotes fallax Tuneva & Esyunin, 2003 — Russia (Europe), Kazakhstan
 Zelotes femellus (L. Koch, 1866) — Southern Europe
 Zelotes flabellis Zhang, Zhu & Tso, 2009 — Taiwan
 Zelotes flagellans (L. Koch, 1882) — Spain (mainland, Balearic Is.)
 Zelotes flavens (L. Koch, 1873) — Australia (Western Australia)
 Zelotes flavimanus (C. L. Koch, 1839) — Greece
 Zelotes flavitarsis (Purcell, 1908) — South Africa
 Zelotes flexuosus Kamura, 1999 — Japan (Ryukyu Is.)
 Zelotes florisbad FitzPatrick, 2007 — South Africa
 Zelotes florodes Platnick & Shadab, 1983 — USA
 Zelotes foresta Platnick & Shadab, 1983 — USA
 Zelotes fratris Chamberlin, 1920 — Russia (middle Siberia to Far East), North America
 Zelotes frenchi Tucker, 1923 — Botswana, Zimbabwe, South Africa
 Zelotes fuligineus (Purcell, 1907) — Central, East, Southern Africa
 Zelotes fulvaster (Simon, 1878) — France (Corsica), Macedonia, Greece
 Zelotes fulvopilosus (Simon, 1878) — Spain (mainland, Balearic Is.), France
 Zelotes funestus (Keyserling, 1887) — USA
 Zelotes fuscimanus (Kroneberg, 1875) — Uzbekistan
 Zelotes fuscorufus (Simon, 1878) — Spain, France (Corsica), Italy
 Zelotes fuscus (Thorell, 1875) — Ukraine, Kazakhstan
 Zelotes fuzeta Wunderlich, 2011 — Portugal
 Zelotes gabriel Platnick & Shadab, 1983 — USA
 Zelotes gallicus Simon, 1914 — Europe, Kazakhstan
 Zelotes galunae Levy, 1998 — Israel
 Zelotes gattefossei Denis, 1952 — Morocco
 Zelotes gertschi Platnick & Shadab, 1983 — USA, Mexico
 Zelotes geshur Levy, 2009 — Israel
 Zelotes gladius Kamura, 1999 — Japan (Ryukyu Is.)
 Zelotes golanensis Levy, 2009 — Israel
 Zelotes gooldi (Purcell, 1907) — Namibia, South Africa
 Zelotes graecus (L. Koch, 1867) — Greece
 Zelotes griswoldi Platnick & Shadab, 1983 — USA
 Zelotes grovus Platnick & Shadab, 1983 — USA
 Zelotes guineanus (Simon, 1907) — West, Central, East Africa
 Zelotes gussakovskyi Charitonov, 1951 — Tajikistan
 Zelotes gynethus Chamberlin, 1919 — USA
 Zelotes haifaensis Levy, 2009 — Israel
 Zelotes hanangensis FitzPatrick, 2007 — Tanzania
 Zelotes haplodrassoides (Denis, 1955) — Niger, Ethiopia
 Zelotes hardwar Platnick & Shadab, 1983 — Jamaica
 Zelotes harmeron Levy, 2009 — Greece, Turkey, Israel
 Zelotes haroni FitzPatrick, 2007 — Zimbabwe, Malawi
 Zelotes hayashii Kamura, 1987 — Japan
 Zelotes helanshan Tang, Urita, Song & Zhao, 1997 — Russia (Altai), China
 Zelotes helicoides Chatzaki, 2010 — Greece (Crete)
 Zelotes helsdingeni Zhang & Song, 2001 — China
 Zelotes henderickxi Bosselaers, 2012 — Canary Is.
 Zelotes hentzi Barrows, 1945 — USA, Canada
 Zelotes hermani (Chyzer, 1897) — Central Europe to Russia (Europe, Caucasus)
 Zelotes hirtus (Thorell, 1875) — France
 Zelotes hispaliensis Senglet, 2011 — Spain
 Zelotes holguin Alayón, 1992 — Cuba
 Zelotes hospitus (Simon, 1897) — India
 Zelotes hui Platnick & Song, 1986 — Kazakhstan, China
 Zelotes humilis (Purcell, 1907) — Zimbabwe, South Africa
 Zelotes hummeli Schenkel, 1936 — Kazakhstan, China
 Zelotes ibayensis FitzPatrick, 2007 — Tanzania
 Zelotes icenoglei Platnick & Shadab, 1983 — USA
 Zelotes illustris Butt & Beg, 2004 — Pakistan
 Zelotes incertissimus Caporiacco, 1934 — Libya
 Zelotes inderensis Ponomarev & Tsvetkov, 2006 — Kazakhstan
 Zelotes inglenook Platnick & Shadab, 1983 — USA
 Zelotes inqayi FitzPatrick, 2007 — Congo
 Zelotes insulanus (L. Koch, 1867) — Greece
 Zelotes insulanus Dalmas, 1922 — Italy
 Zelotes invidus (Purcell, 1907) — Namibia, South Africa
 Zelotes iriomotensis Kamura, 1994 — Japan
 Zelotes itandae FitzPatrick, 2007 — Congo
 Zelotes ivieorum Platnick & Shadab, 1983 — Mexico
 Zelotes jabalpurensis Tikader & Gajbe, 1976 — India
 Zelotes jamaicensis Platnick & Shadab, 1983 — Jamaica
 Zelotes jocquei FitzPatrick, 2007 — Kenya
 Zelotes josephine Platnick & Shadab, 1983 — USA
 Zelotes katombora FitzPatrick, 2007 — Zimbabwe
 Zelotes kazachstanicus Ponomarev & Tsvetkov, 2006 — Kazakhstan
 Zelotes kerimi (Pavesi, 1880) — Tunisia
 Zelotes keumjeungsanensis Paik, 1986 — China, Korea
 Zelotes khostensis Kovblyuk & Ponomarev, 2008 — Italy, Caucasus (Russia, Georgia)
 Zelotes kimi Paik, 1992 — Korea
 Zelotes kimwha Paik, 1986 — Korea, Japan
 Zelotes konarus Roewer, 1961 — Afghanistan
 Zelotes kulempikus FitzPatrick, 2007 — Kenya
 Zelotes kulukhunus FitzPatrick, 2007 — Burkina Faso, Chad
 Zelotes kumazomba FitzPatrick, 2007 — Malawi
 Zelotes kuncinyanus FitzPatrick, 2007 — South Africa
 Zelotes kuntzi Denis, 1953 — Yemen
 Zelotes kusumae Tikader, 1982 — India
 Zelotes laccus (Barrows, 1919) — USA, Canada
 Zelotes laconicus Senglet, 2011 — Greece
 Zelotes laetus (O. Pickard-Cambridge, 1872) — North Africa to Senegal and Kenya, Portugal, France, Israel, Saudi Arabia. Introduced to Hawaii, USA, Mexico, Peru
 Zelotes laghmanus Roewer, 1961 — Afghanistan
 Zelotes lagrecai Di Franco, 1994 — Portugal, Spain, Morocco
 Zelotes lasalanus Chamberlin, 1928 — North America
 Zelotes latreillei (Simon, 1878) — Europe, Turkey, Caucasus, Russia (Europe to south Siberia), Kazakhstan
 Zelotes lavus Tucker, 1923 — Southern Africa
 Zelotes lehavim Levy, 2009 — Israel
 Zelotes liaoi Platnick & Song, 1986 — China, Taiwan
 Zelotes lichenyensis FitzPatrick, 2007 — Malawi
 Zelotes lightfooti (Purcell, 1907) — South Africa
 Zelotes limnatis Chatzaki & Russell-Smith, 2017 — Cyprus
 Zelotes listeri (Audouin, 1826) — Egypt
 Zelotes lividus Mello-Leitão, 1943 — Argentina
 Zelotes longestylus Simon, 1914 — France
 Zelotes longinquus (L. Koch, 1866) — Algeria
 Zelotes longipes (L. Koch, 1866) — Europe, Turkey, Caucasus, Russia (Europe to Far East), Central Asia, Mongolia, China
 Zelotes lotzi FitzPatrick, 2007 — South Africa
 Zelotes lubumbashi FitzPatrick, 2007 — Congo
 Zelotes lutorius (Tullgren, 1910) — Tanzania
 Zelotes lymnophilus Chamberlin, 1936 — USA
 Zelotes maccaricus Di Franco, 1998 — Italy
 Zelotes maindroni (Simon, 1905) — India
 Zelotes mandae Tikader & Gajbe, 1979 — India
 Zelotes mandlaensis Tikader & Gajbe, 1976 — India
 Zelotes manius (Simon, 1878) — Southern Europe
 Zelotes manzae (Strand, 1908) — Canary Is.
 Zelotes mashonus FitzPatrick, 2007 — Congo, Botswana, Zimbabwe, South Africa
 Zelotes matobensis FitzPatrick, 2007 — Zimbabwe
 Zelotes mayanus Chamberlin & Ivie, 1938 — Mexico
 Zelotes mazumbai FitzPatrick, 2007 — Tanzania
 Zelotes mediocris (Kulczyński, 1901) — Ethiopia
 Zelotes meinsohni Denis, 1954 — Morocco
 Zelotes meronensis Levy, 1998 — Israel
 Zelotes mesa Platnick & Shadab, 1983 — USA, Mexico
 Zelotes messinai Di Franco, 1995 — Italy
 Zelotes metellus Roewer, 1928 — France, Albania, Greece to Iran, Israel, Russia (Europe)
 Zelotes mikhailovi Marusik, 1995 — Russia (Europe), Kazakhstan, Mongolia
 Zelotes minous Chatzaki, 2003 — Greece (Crete)
 Zelotes miramar Platnick & Shadab, 1983 — Mexico
 Zelotes mkomazi FitzPatrick, 2007 — Tanzania
 Zelotes moestus (O. Pickard-Cambridge, 1898) — Mexico
 Zelotes monachus Chamberlin, 1924 — USA, Mexico
 Zelotes monodens Chamberlin, 1936 — USA
 Zelotes mosioatunya FitzPatrick, 2007 — Botswana, Zambia, Zimbabwe
 Zelotes muizenbergensis FitzPatrick, 2007 — South Africa
 Zelotes mulanjensis FitzPatrick, 2007 — Malawi
 Zelotes mundus (Kulczyński, 1897) — Europe, Russia (Europe to south Siberia), Kazakhstan, China
 Zelotes murcidus Simon, 1914 — France
 Zelotes murphyorum FitzPatrick, 2007 — Kenya
 Zelotes musapi FitzPatrick, 2007 — Zimbabwe
 Zelotes nainitalensis Tikader & Gajbe, 1976 — India
 Zelotes naliniae Tikader & Gajbe, 1979 — India
 Zelotes namaquus FitzPatrick, 2007 — South Africa
 Zelotes namibensis FitzPatrick, 2007 — Namibia
 Zelotes nannodes Chamberlin, 1936 — USA
 Zelotes naphthalii Levy, 2009 — Israel
 Zelotes nasikensis Tikader & Gajbe, 1976 — India
 Zelotes natalensis Tucker, 1923 — South Africa
 Zelotes ngomensis FitzPatrick, 2007 — South Africa
 Zelotes nilgirinus Reimoser, 1934 — India
 Zelotes nishikawai Kamura, 2010 — Taiwan
 Zelotes nyathii FitzPatrick, 2007 — Congo, Botswana, Zimbabwe
 Zelotes oblongus (C. L. Koch, 1833) — Europe, Turkey
 Zelotes ocala Platnick & Shadab, 1983 — USA
 Zelotes occidentalis Melic, 2014 — Portugal, Spain
 Zelotes occultus Tuneva & Esyunin, 2003 — Russia (Europe, Urals)
 Zelotes olympi (Kulczyński, 1903) — Bulgaria, Ukraine, Turkey, Russia (Caucasus)
 Zelotes orenburgensis Tuneva & Esyunin, 2003 — Ukraine, Russia (Europe, Caucasus), Kazakhstan
 Zelotes oryx (Simon, 1880) — Morocco, Algeria
 Zelotes otavi FitzPatrick, 2007 — Namibia, Botswana
 Zelotes ovambensis Lawrence, 1927 — Namibia
 Zelotes ovtsharenkoi Zhang & Song, 2001 — China
 Zelotes pakistaniensis Butt & Beg, 2004 — Pakistan
 Zelotes pallidipes Tucker, 1923 — Namibia
 Zelotes paradderet Levy, 2009 — Israel
 Zelotes paraegregius Wunderlich, 2012 — Canary Is.
 Zelotes paranaensis Mello-Leitão, 1947 — Brazil
 Zelotes parascrutatus Levy, 1998 — Israel
 Zelotes paroculus Simon, 1914 — France, Italy
 Zelotes pediculatoides Senglet, 2011 — Spain
 Zelotes pediculatus Marinaro, 1967 — Algeria, Israel
 Zelotes pedimaculosus Tucker, 1923 — Namibia
 Zelotes perditus Chamberlin, 1922 — USA
 Zelotes petrensis (C. L. Koch, 1839) — Europe, Turkey, Caucasus, Russia (Europe to south Siberia), Central Asia
 Zelotes petrophilus Chamberlin, 1936 — USA
 Zelotes pexus (Simon, 1885) — India
 Zelotes piceus (Kroneberg, 1875) — Tajikistan
 Zelotes piercy Platnick & Shadab, 1983 — USA
 Zelotes pinos Platnick & Shadab, 1983 — USA
 Zelotes planiger Roewer, 1961 — Afghanistan
 Zelotes plumiger (L. Koch, 1882) — Spain (Majorca)
 Zelotes pluridentatus Marinaro, 1967 — Algeria
 Zelotes poecilochroaeformis Denis, 1937 — Algeria, Tunisia
 Zelotes poonaensis Tikader & Gajbe, 1976 — India
 Zelotes potanini Schenkel, 1963 — Russia (Urals to Far East), Kazakhstan, China, Korea, Japan
 Zelotes prishutovae Ponomarev & Tsvetkov, 2006 — Greece, Turkey, Ukraine, Russia (Europe)
 Zelotes pseudoapricorum Schenkel, 1963 — Kazakhstan, China
 Zelotes pseudogallicus Ponomarev, 2007 — Ukraine, Russia (Europe to west Siberia), Kazakhstan
 Zelotes pseudopusillus Caporiacco, 1934 — India
 Zelotes pseustes Chamberlin, 1922 — USA, Mexico
 Zelotes pulchellus Butt & Beg, 2004 — Pakistan
 Zelotes pulchripes (Purcell, 1908) — South Africa
 Zelotes pullus (Bryant, 1936) — USA
 Zelotes puritanus Chamberlin, 1922 — North America, Europe, Turkey, Russia (Europe to Far East), Kazakhstan
 Zelotes pyrenaeus Di Franco & Blick, 2003 — France
 Zelotes quadridentatus (Strand, 1906) — Tunisia
 Zelotes quipungo FitzPatrick, 2007 — Angola
 Zelotes qwabergensis FitzPatrick, 2007 — South Africa
 Zelotes radiatus Lawrence, 1928 — Southern Africa
 Zelotes rainier Platnick & Shadab, 1983 — USA
 Zelotes reduncus (Purcell, 1907) — South Africa
 Zelotes reimoseri Roewer, 1951 — France
 Zelotes remyi Denis, 1954 — Algeria
 Zelotes resolution FitzPatrick, 2007 — South Africa
 Zelotes rinske van Helsdingen, 2012 — Italy
 Zelotes rothschildi (Simon, 1909) — Ethiopia, Congo
 Zelotes rufi Esyunin & Efimik, 1997 — Russia (Urals), Kazakhstan
 Zelotes rugege FitzPatrick, 2007 — Congo, Rwanda
 Zelotes rungwensis FitzPatrick, 2007 — Tanzania
 Zelotes ryukyuensis Kamura, 1999 — Japan (Ryukyu Is.)
 Zelotes sajali Tikader & Gajbe, 1979 — India
 Zelotes sanmen Platnick & Song, 1986 — China
 Zelotes santos Platnick & Shadab, 1983 — Mexico
 Zelotes sarawakensis (Thorell, 1890) — Pakistan to Indonesia (Borneo) and Australia
 Zelotes sardus (Canestrini, 1873) — France, Italy
 Zelotes sataraensis Tikader & Gajbe, 1979 — India
 Zelotes sclateri Tucker, 1923 — South Africa, Lesotho
 Zelotes scrutatus (O. Pickard-Cambridge, 1872) — Canary Is., Africa to Central Asia
 Zelotes segrex (Simon, 1878) — Europe, Turkey, Caucasus, Russia (Europe) to Central Asia
 Zelotes serratus Wunderlich, 2011 — Portugal, Spain
 Zelotes shabae FitzPatrick, 2007 — Congo
 Zelotes shaked Levy, 1998 — Israel
 Zelotes shantae Tikader, 1982 — India
 Zelotes siculus (Simon, 1878) — Italy (Sicily)
 Zelotes similis (Kulczyński, 1887) — Italy, Central Europe to Turkey
 Zelotes sindi Caporiacco, 1934 — India, Pakistan
 Zelotes singroboensis Jézéquel, 1965 — Ivory Coast
 Zelotes siyabonga FitzPatrick, 2007 — Zimbabwe
 Zelotes skinnerensis Platnick & Prentice, 1999 — USA
 Zelotes somaliensis FitzPatrick, 2007 — Somalia
 Zelotes songus FitzPatrick, 2007 — South Africa
 Zelotes soulouensis FitzPatrick, 2007 — Burkina Faso
 Zelotes spadix (L. Koch, 1866) — Spain, Greece, North Africa
 Zelotes spilosus Yin, 2012 — China
 Zelotes spinulosus Denis, 1958 — Afghanistan
 Zelotes stolidus (Simon, 1880) — Algeria, Libya
 Zelotes strandi (Nosek, 1905) — Bulgaria, Turkey
 Zelotes subaeneus (Simon, 1886) — Senegal
 Zelotes subterraneus (C. L. Koch, 1833) (type) — Europe, Turkey, Caucasus, Russia (Europe to Far East), Central Asia, China
 Zelotes sula Lowrie & Gertsch, 1955 — Russia (Far East), North America
 Zelotes surekhae Tikader & Gajbe, 1976 — India
 Zelotes swelus FitzPatrick, 2007 — Congo
 Zelotes talpa Platnick & Shadab, 1983 — Mexico
 Zelotes talpinus (L. Koch, 1872) — Western to Central Europe, Italy
 Zelotes tambaramensis Caleb & Mathai, 2013 — India
 Zelotes tarsalis Fage, 1929 — North Africa
 Zelotes tendererus FitzPatrick, 2007 — Malawi, Zambia, Zimbabwe
 Zelotes tenuis (L. Koch, 1866) — Mediterranean and Central Europe to Russia (Caucasus), Iran. Introduced to Galapagos Is., USA
 Zelotes tetramamillatus (Caporiacco, 1947) — Tanzania
 Zelotes thorelli Simon, 1914 — Portugal, Spain, France
 Zelotes tongdao Yin, Bao & Zhang, 1999 — China
 Zelotes tortuosus Kamura, 1987 — Korea, Japan
 Zelotes tragicus (O. Pickard-Cambridge, 1872) — Chad, Ethiopia, Israel
 Zelotes trimaculatus Mello-Leitão, 1930 — Brazil
 Zelotes tristis (Thorell, 1871) — Sweden
 Zelotes tropicalis FitzPatrick, 2007 — West, Central Africa
 Zelotes tsaii Platnick & Song, 1986 — China
 Zelotes tuckeri Roewer, 1951 — East, Southern Africa
 Zelotes tulare Platnick & Shadab, 1983 — USA
 Zelotes tuobus Chamberlin, 1919 — USA, Canada
 Zelotes turanicus Charitonov, 1946 — Uzbekistan
 Zelotes turcicus Seyyar, Demir & Aktaş, 2010 — Turkey
 Zelotes ubicki Platnick & Shadab, 1983 — Mexico
 Zelotes uniformis Mello-Leitão, 1941 — Argentina
 Zelotes union Platnick & Shadab, 1983 — Mexico
 Zelotes univittatus (Simon, 1897) — India
 Zelotes uquathus FitzPatrick, 2007 — South Africa
 Zelotes uronesae Melic, 2014 — Spain
 Zelotes vespertinus (Thorell, 1875) — France, Italy, Bulgaria, Macedonia
 Zelotes vikela FitzPatrick, 2007 — Senegal
 Zelotes viola Platnick & Shadab, 1983 — USA
 Zelotes viveki Gajbe, 2005 — India
 Zelotes wallacei Melic, Silva & Barrientos, 2016 — Portugal, Spain
 Zelotes wuchangensis Schenkel, 1963 — China, Korea
 Zelotes wunderlichi Blick, 2017 — Turkey
 Zelotes xerophilus Levy, 1998 — Israel
 Zelotes xiaoi Yin, Bao & Zhang, 1999 — China
 Zelotes yani Yin, Bao & Zhang, 1999 — China
 Zelotes yinae Platnick & Song, 1986 — China
 Zelotes yogeshi Gajbe, 2005 — India
 Zelotes yosemite Platnick & Shadab, 1983 — USA
 Zelotes zekharya Levy, 2009 — Cyprus, Israel, Iran
 Zelotes zellensis Grimm, 1982 — Germany, Austria
 Zelotes zephyrus Kamura, 1999 — Japan (Ryukyu Is.)
 Zelotes zhaoi Platnick & Song, 1986 — Russia (Far East), China
 Zelotes zhengi Platnick & Song, 1986 — China
 Zelotes zhui Yang & Tang, 2003 — China
 Zelotes zin Levy, 1998 — Israel
 Zelotes zonognathus (Purcell, 1907) — West, Central, Southern Africa

Zelotibia

Zelotibia Russell-Smith & Murphy, 2005
 Zelotibia acicula Russell-Smith & Murphy, 2005 — Congo
 Zelotibia angelica Nzigidahera & Jocqué, 2009 — Burundi
 Zelotibia bicornuta Russell-Smith & Murphy, 2005 — Tanzania
 Zelotibia cultella Russell-Smith & Murphy, 2005 — Congo
 Zelotibia curvifemur Nzigidahera & Jocqué, 2009 — Burundi
 Zelotibia dolabra Russell-Smith & Murphy, 2005 — Congo
 Zelotibia filiformis Russell-Smith & Murphy, 2005 — Congo, Burundi
 Zelotibia flexuosa Russell-Smith & Murphy, 2005 — Congo, Rwanda
 Zelotibia fosseyae Nzigidahera & Jocqué, 2009 — Burundi
 Zelotibia johntony Nzigidahera & Jocqué, 2009 — Congo
 Zelotibia kaibos Russell-Smith & Murphy, 2005 — Kenya
 Zelotibia kanama Nzigidahera & Jocqué, 2009 — Rwanda
 Zelotibia kibira Nzigidahera & Jocqué, 2009 — Burundi
 Zelotibia lejeunei Nzigidahera & Jocqué, 2009 — Congo
 Zelotibia major Russell-Smith & Murphy, 2005 — Burundi
 Zelotibia mitella Russell-Smith & Murphy, 2005 (type) — Congo
 Zelotibia papillata Russell-Smith & Murphy, 2005 — Congo, Rwanda
 Zelotibia paucipapillata Russell-Smith & Murphy, 2005 — Congo, Burundi
 Zelotibia scobina Russell-Smith & Murphy, 2005 — Congo
 Zelotibia simpula Russell-Smith & Murphy, 2005 — Congo, Kenya
 Zelotibia subsessa Nzigidahera & Jocqué, 2009 — Burundi
 Zelotibia supercilia Russell-Smith & Murphy, 2005 — Congo

Zelowan

Zelowan Murphy & Russell-Smith, 2010
 Zelowan allegena Murphy & Russell-Smith, 2010 — Congo
 Zelowan bulbiformis Murphy & Russell-Smith, 2010 — Congo
 Zelowan cochleare Murphy & Russell-Smith, 2010 — Congo
 Zelowan cordiformis Murphy & Russell-Smith, 2010 — Congo
 Zelowan cuniculiformis Murphy & Russell-Smith, 2010 — Congo
 Zelowan ensifer Murphy & Russell-Smith, 2010 — Congo
 Zelowan etruricassis Murphy & Russell-Smith, 2010 — Congo
 Zelowan falciformis Murphy & Russell-Smith, 2010 — Congo
 Zelowan galea Murphy & Russell-Smith, 2010 — Congo
 Zelowan larva Murphy & Russell-Smith, 2010 — Congo
 Zelowan mammosa Murphy & Russell-Smith, 2010 — Congo
 Zelowan nodivulva Murphy & Russell-Smith, 2010 — Burundi
 Zelowan pyriformis Murphy & Russell-Smith, 2010 — Congo
 Zelowan remota Murphy & Russell-Smith, 2010 — Namibia
 Zelowan rostrata Murphy & Russell-Smith, 2010 — Congo
 Zelowan rotundipalpis Murphy & Russell-Smith, 2010 — Congo
 Zelowan similis Murphy & Russell-Smith, 2010 — Congo
 Zelowan spiculiformis Murphy & Russell-Smith, 2010 (type) — Congo

Zimirina

Zimirina Dalmas, 1919
 Zimirina brevipes Pérez & Blasco, 1986 — Spain, Italy (Sardinia)
 Zimirina cineris Cooke, 1964 — Canary Is.
 Zimirina deserticola Dalmas, 1919 — Algeria
 Zimirina gomerae (Schmidt, 1981) — Canary Is.
 Zimirina grancanariensis Wunderlich, 1992 — Canary Is.
 Zimirina hirsuta Cooke, 1964 — Canary Is.
 Zimirina lepida (Blackwall, 1859) — Madeira
 Zimirina moyaensis Wunderlich, 1992 — Canary Is.
 Zimirina nabavii Wunderlich, 2011 — Canary Is.
 Zimirina penicillata (Simon, 1893) (type) — Algeria
 Zimirina relegata Cooke, 1977 — St. Helena
 Zimirina spinicymbia Wunderlich, 1992 — Canary Is.
 Zimirina tenuidens Denis, 1956 — Morocco
 Zimirina transvaalica Dalmas, 1919 — South Africa
 Zimirina vastitatis Cooke, 1964 — Libya, Egypt

Zimiris

Zimiris Simon, 1882
 Zimiris diffusa Platnick & Penney, 2004 — Yemen (Socotra), India. Introduced to St. Helena
 Zimiris doriae Simon, 1882 (type) — Ivory Coast, Sudan, Eritrea, Yemen, Iran, India. Introduced to Mexico, Caribbean, French Guiana, Brazil, Germany, Indonesia (Java), Malaysia

Zimiromus

Zimiromus Banks, 1914
 Zimiromus aduncus Platnick & Shadab, 1976 — Panama
 Zimiromus atrifus Platnick & Höfer, 1990 — Brazil
 Zimiromus beni Platnick & Shadab, 1981 — Bolivia, Brazil
 Zimiromus bimini Platnick & Shadab, 1976 — Bahama Is.
 Zimiromus boistus Platnick & Höfer, 1990 — Brazil
 Zimiromus brachet Platnick & Shadab, 1976 — Ecuador
 Zimiromus buzios Brescovit & Buckup, 1998 — Brazil
 Zimiromus canje Platnick & Shadab, 1979 — Guyana
 Zimiromus chickeringi Platnick & Shadab, 1976 — Panama
 Zimiromus circulus Platnick & Shadab, 1976 — Peru
 Zimiromus dorado Platnick & Shadab, 1979 — Peru
 Zimiromus eberhardi Platnick & Shadab, 1976 — Colombia
 Zimiromus exlineae Platnick & Shadab, 1976 — Ecuador
 Zimiromus hortenciae Buckup & Brescovit, 1993 — Brazil
 Zimiromus iotus (Banks, 1929) — Panama
 Zimiromus jamaicensis Platnick & Shadab, 1976 — Jamaica
 Zimiromus kleini Buckup & Brescovit, 1993 — Brazil
 Zimiromus kochalkai Platnick & Shadab, 1976 — Colombia
 Zimiromus lawa Platnick & Shadab, 1981 — Suriname
 Zimiromus lingua Platnick & Shadab, 1976 — Mexico
 Zimiromus lubricus (Simon, 1893) — Venezuela, Trinidad
 Zimiromus malkini Platnick & Shadab, 1976 — Nicaragua
 Zimiromus medius (Keyserling, 1891) — Brazil
 Zimiromus montenegro Buckup & Brescovit, 1993 — Brazil
 Zimiromus muchmorei Platnick & Shadab, 1976 — Virgin Is.
 Zimiromus nadleri Platnick & Shadab, 1979 — Suriname
 Zimiromus penai Platnick & Shadab, 1976 — Ecuador
 Zimiromus piura Platnick & Shadab, 1976 — Peru
 Zimiromus platnicki Brescovit & Höfer, 1994 — Bolivia
 Zimiromus rabago Platnick & Shadab, 1976 — Colombia
 Zimiromus racamus Buckup & Brescovit, 1993 — Brazil
 Zimiromus recs Zapata & Grismado, 2012 — Argentina
 Zimiromus reichardti Platnick & Shadab, 1976 — Brazil
 Zimiromus rothi Platnick & Shadab, 1981 — Mexico
 Zimiromus sinop Platnick & Shadab, 1981 — Brazil, Argentina
 Zimiromus sununga Buckup & Brescovit, 1993 — Brazil
 Zimiromus syenus Buckup & Brescovit, 1993 — Brazil
 Zimiromus tapirape Brescovit & Buckup, 1998 — Brazil
 Zimiromus tonina Platnick & Shadab, 1976 — Mexico
 Zimiromus tropicalis (Banks, 1909) (type) — Costa Rica, Panama
 Zimiromus volksberg Platnick & Shadab, 1981 — Suriname

References

Gnaphosidae
Gnaphosidae